= Religion in Tunisia =

Religion in Tunisia (2022)
1. Islam (99.0%)
2. Christianity and Judaism (1.00%)
Would describe yourself as religious, somewhat religious, or not religious? (2020)
1. Religious (28.9%)
2. Somewhat religious (42.3%)
3. Not religious (26.7%)
4. Don't know (1.60%)
5. Refused to answer (0.50%)

Islam is the most prevalent religion in Tunisia. In 2022, it was estimated that approximately 99% of Tunisia's inhabitants identified as Muslims. The country also includes Christian, Jewish, and Baháʼí communities. The 2022 Tunisian Constitution does not state Islam as the state religion and instead says that the country is part of the Islamic world.

The Constitution of Tunisia provides for freedom of religion, belief, and the freedom to practice the rites of one's religion unless they disturb the public order. The government does not permit the establishment of political parties on the basis of religion and prohibits efforts to proselytize. Although changing religions is legal, there is great societal pressure against Muslims who decide to leave Islam.

== Faiths ==
=== Islam ===
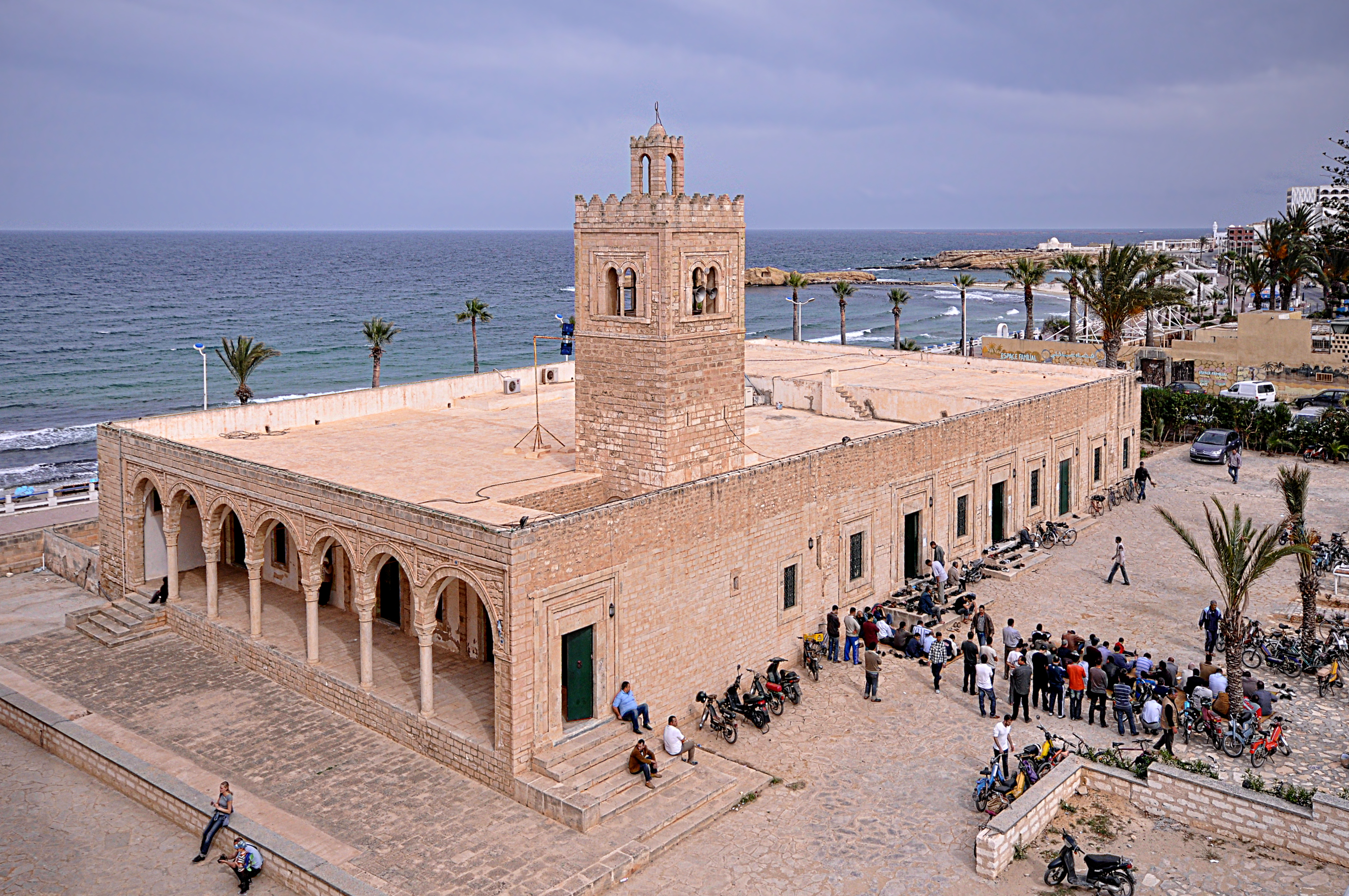
The Great Mosque of Monastir

Islam was the official religion of Tunisia until 2022, when it was removed as the official religion. The majority of Tunisians consider themselves to be Muslim, who according to the Pew Research Center 58% identify themselves as Sunni Muslims, while 40% say they are only Muslims without affiliation to any sect.

The government controls and subsidizes mosques and pays the salaries of prayer leaders. The President appoints the Grand Mufti of the Republic. The 1988 Law on Mosques provides that only personnel appointed by the Government may lead activities in mosques and stipulates that mosques must remain closed except during prayer times and other authorized religious ceremonies, such as marriages or funerals. Some people may be interrogated just for associating or being seen in the street with practicing Muslims. New mosques may be built in accordance with national urban planning regulations; however, upon completion, they become the property of the Government. The Government also partially subsidizes the Jewish community.

Sufism is popular throughout Tunisia, both among orthodox Sunni Muslims and among minority sects. The Shadhili Order is of particular importance in Tunisia, as it is elsewhere in North Africa. Also as elsewhere in North Africa, Sufism in Tunisia is characterised by "Maraboutic" traditions. The Muslim holidays of Eid al-Adha, Eid al-Fitr, and Mawlid are considered national holidays in Tunisia.

=== Christianity ===
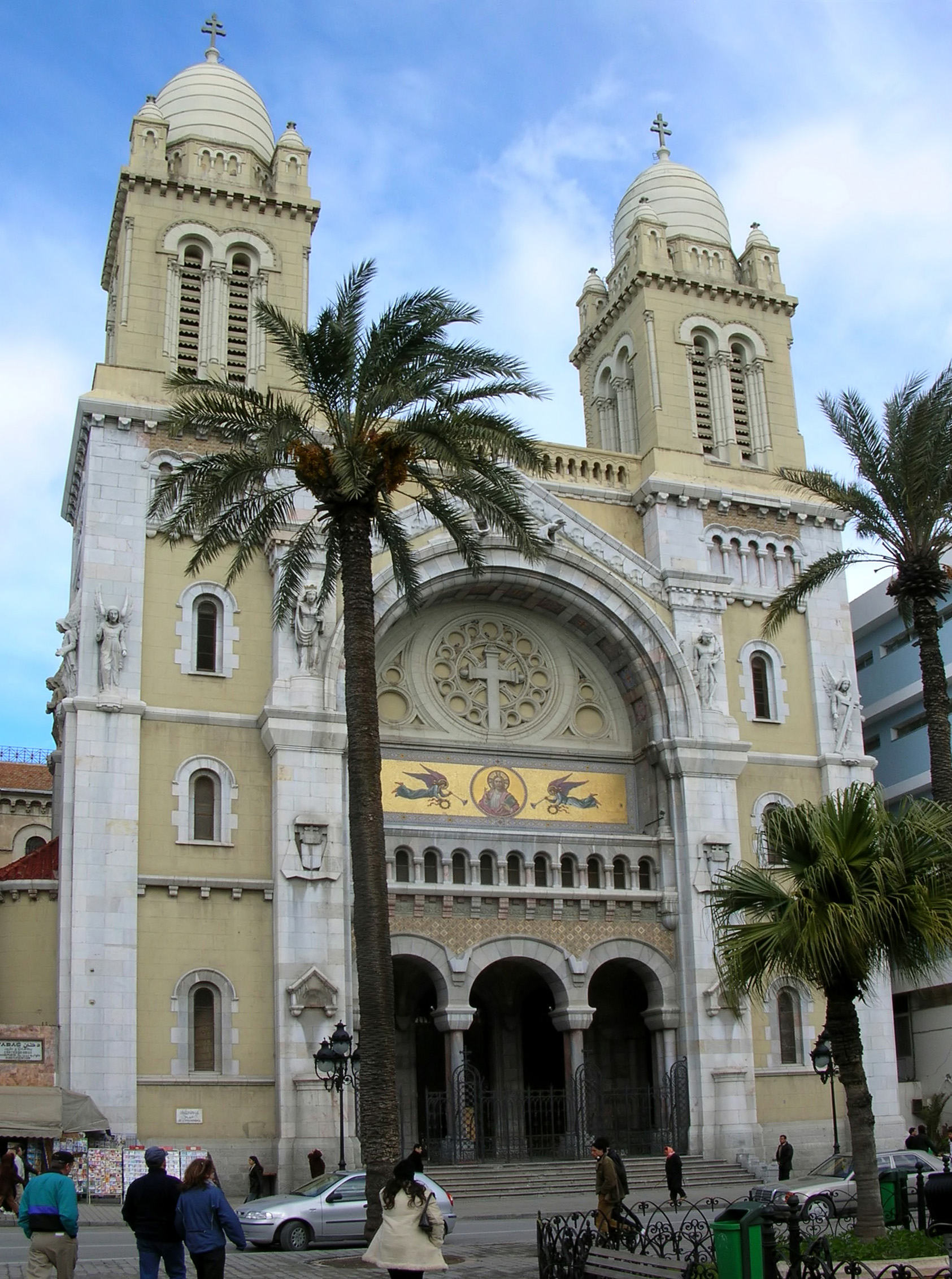
Cathedral of St. Vincent de Paul, Tunis.

The International Religious Freedom Report of 2022 reported that the Christian community numbered 30,000 people, 24,000 of whom were Catholics. In the Annuario Pontificio of 2020, the number of Catholics is estimated to have risen to 30,440.

Christianity came in Tunisia during Roman rule. However, after the arrival of Islam, the population of Christians decreased in the country.

From the late 19th century to after World War II, Tunisia was home to large populations of Christian French, Italian and Maltese descent (255,000 Europeans in 1956).

==== Figures in 2007 ====
In 2007, the Catholic Church in Tunisia, which is coterminous with the Archdiocese of Tunis, operated 12 churches, nine schools, several libraries, and two clinics; in addition to holding religious services, the Catholic Church opened a monastery, freely organizes cultural activities, and performs charitable work throughout the country.

According to church leaders, there are 2,000 practising Protestant Christians. The International Religious Freedom Report for 2007 estimated thousands of Tunisian Muslims have converted to Christianity. The Russian Orthodox Church has approximately 100 practising members and operates a church in Tunis and another in Bizerte. The Reformed Church of France maintains a church in Tunis, with a congregation of 140 primarily foreign members. The Anglican Church has a church in Tunis with several hundred predominantly foreign members. There are fifty Seventh-day Adventists. The thirty-member Greek Orthodox Church maintained three churches (in Tunis, Sousse, and Djerba). Occasionally, Catholic and Protestant groups held services in private residences or other locations.

Scattered among the various churches, though mostly evangelical, are also a number of Christian believers from Muslim backgrounds. A 2015 study estimated some 500 such individuals in Tunisia.

In 2022, there was no accurate break-down of Christian denominations.

=== Judaism ===
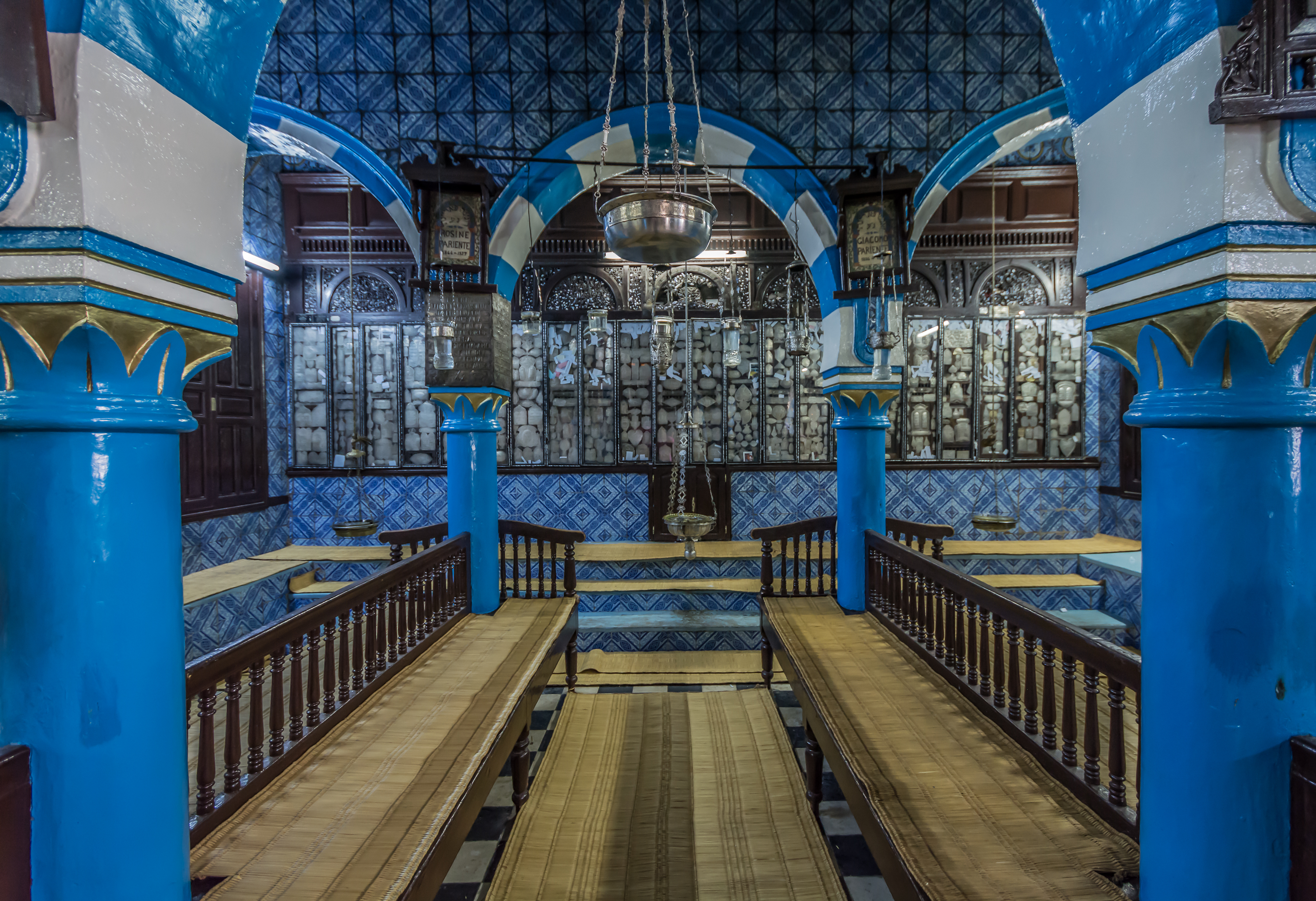
El Ghriba synagogue in Djerba is an important site for Jewish pilgrimage.

Judaism is the country's fourth largest religion with 1,500 members. Three-quarters of them lived in Djerba and Zarzis; the Jewish community in Djerba dates back 2,600 years.

The government grants Jews freedom of worship and pays the salary of the chief rabbi. It partially subsidizes the restoration and maintenance of some synagogues. It also authorizes the Jewish community to run private religious schools and allows Jewish children on the island of Djerba to share their study day between secular public schools and private religious schools.

=== Baha'i faith ===
The Bahá'í Faith in Tunisia begins circa 1910 when the first Bahá'í arrived, possibly from Egypt. In 1963 a survey of the community counted 1 assembly and 18 organized groups (between 1 and 9 adults) of Bahá'ís in Tunisia. In 2001, the US State Department estimated the size of the Bahá'í community to be about 150 persons, but the corresponding report from 2022 stated there was no reliable information on the size of the community. However Association of Religion Data Archives and several other sources have pointed to between 1,000 and 2,400 Bahá'ís in the country.

== Religiosity ==
The percentage of Tunisians identifying themselves as non-religious increased from around 12% in 2013 to around 33% in 2018,. In the survey, nearly a half of the young Tunisians described themselves as non-religious. According to the same Arab Barometer Survey, in 2018, 99.4% of Tunisians Identified as Muslims, while 0.3% responded with no religion and 0.3% responded with other.

The Arab Barometer found that about 46% of the Tunisian youth said they were not religious. However, as of July 2022, new surveys by the Arab Barometer say otherwise, particularly BBC's programme, The Newsroom journalists highlighting that the previously noted wave of those saying they were not religious has been, in fact, "reversed".

== Freedom of religion ==
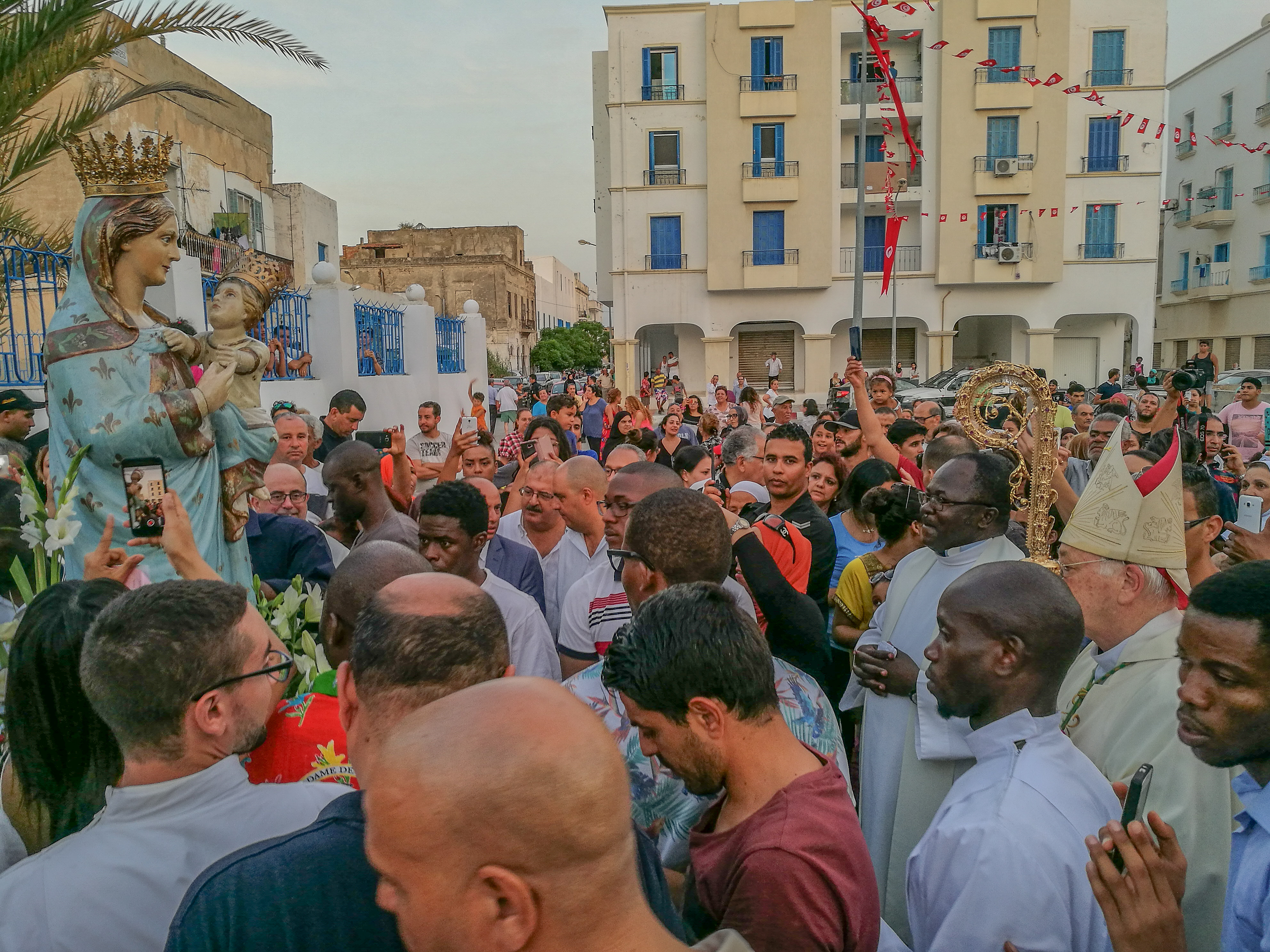
Christians celebrating Our Lady of Trapani procession in Tunis in 2017.

The Constitution of Tunisia provides for freedom of religion, belief and the freedom to practice the rites of one's religion unless they disturb the public order. The government does not permit the establishment of political parties on the basis of religion and prohibits efforts to proselytize. Although changing religions is legal, there is great societal pressure against Muslims who decide to leave Islam.

In 2017, a handful of men were arrested for eating in public during Ramadan, they were convicted of committing “a provocative act of public indecency” and sentenced to month-long jail sentences. The state in Tunisia has a role as a "guardian of religion" which was used to justify the arrests.

The government allows a small number of foreign religious charitable nongovernmental organizations (NGOs) to operate and provide social services.

In 2023, the country was scored 3 out of 4 for religious freedom. In the same year, it was ranked as the 36th worst place in the world to be a Christian.
