= Madonna of Trapani =

Church and minor basilica in Trapani, Sicily, Italy

Basilica-Sanctuary of Maria Santissima Annunziata
- Basilica santuario di Maria Santissima Annunziata
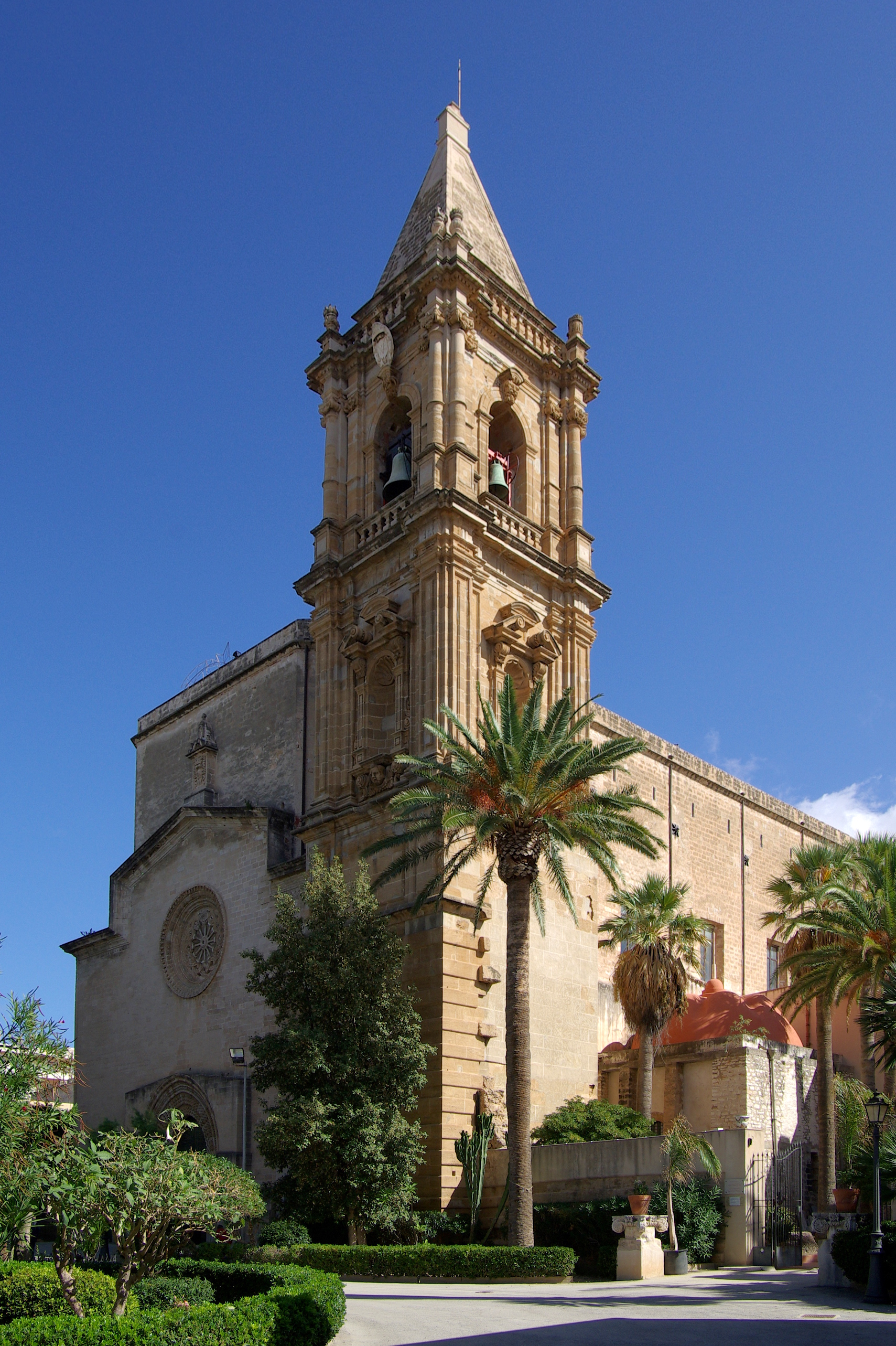
- Basilica-Sanctuary of Maria Santissima Annunziata, Trapani
- Basilica-Sanctuary of Maria Santissima Annunziata
- 38°1′8.724″N 12°32′30.160″E
- Location: Trapani, Sicily, Italy
- Country: Italy
- Denomination: Roman Catholic

History
- Status: Minor basilica
- Dedication: Maria Santissima Annunziata

Architecture
- Functional status: Active
- Architect: Simone Pisano (bell tower)
- Architectural type: Church
- Style: Gothic, Renaissance, Baroque

Administration
- Diocese: Roman Catholic Diocese of Trapani

Madonna of Trapani is the common name for the Basilica-Sanctuary of Maria Santissima Annunziata, a Roman Catholic church, minor basilica, and former Carmelite convent in Trapani, Sicily. The sanctuary is dedicated to the Annunciation and to the Blessed Virgin Mary of Mount Carmel. The sanctuary includes the Chapel of the Madonna of Trapani, where the marble statue of the same name, a medieval representation of the Virgin and Child, is preserved.

The sanctuary stands on the eastern edge of Trapani along the historic route to Erice. At the time of its foundation in the early fourteenth century it lay outside the medieval city walls, in an area that was later incorporated into the urban fabric. The church forms part of the Roman Catholic Diocese of Trapani.

== History ==
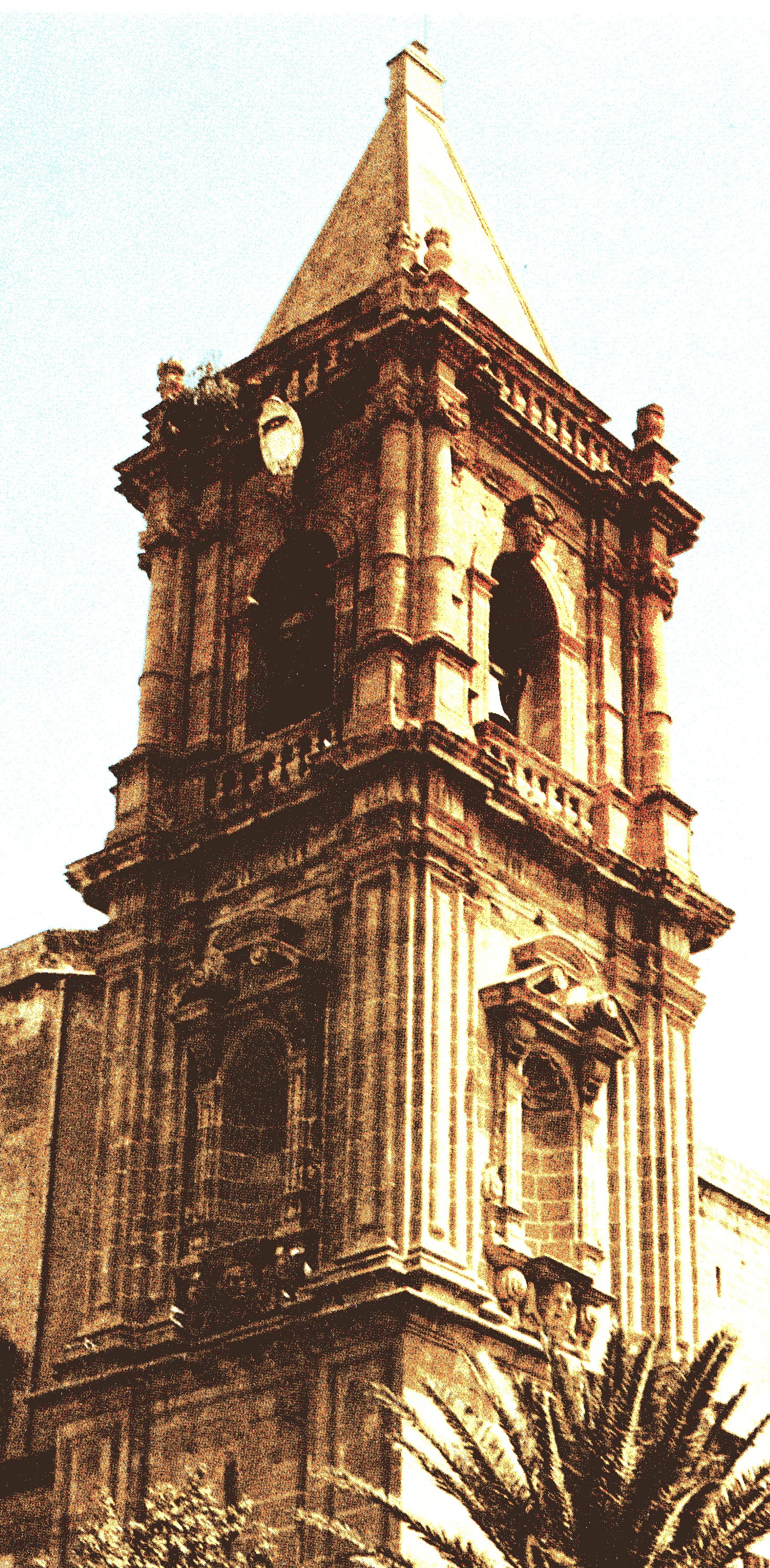
The bell tower, built later and completed in the 17th century.

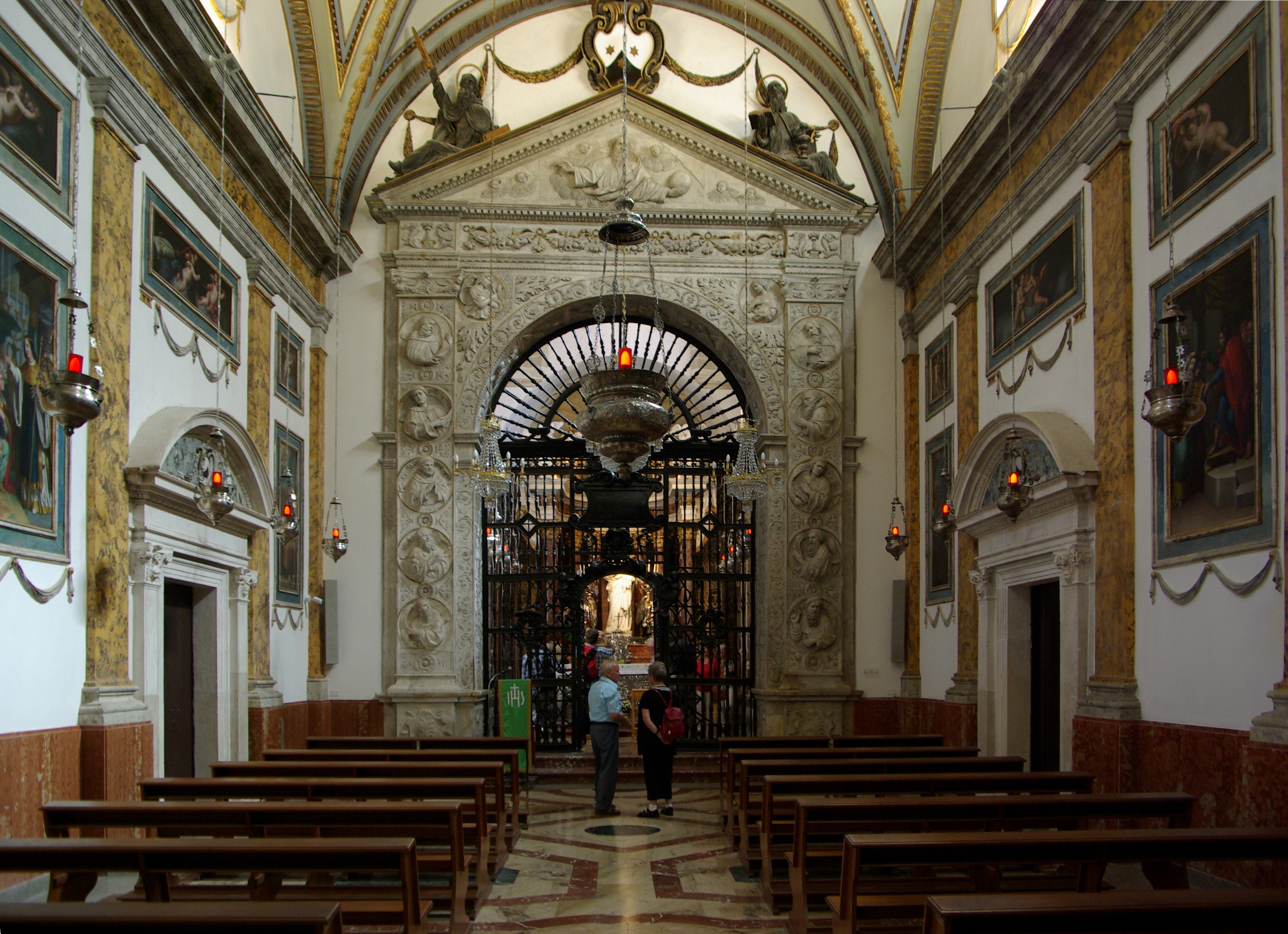
Chapel of the Madonna of Trapani.

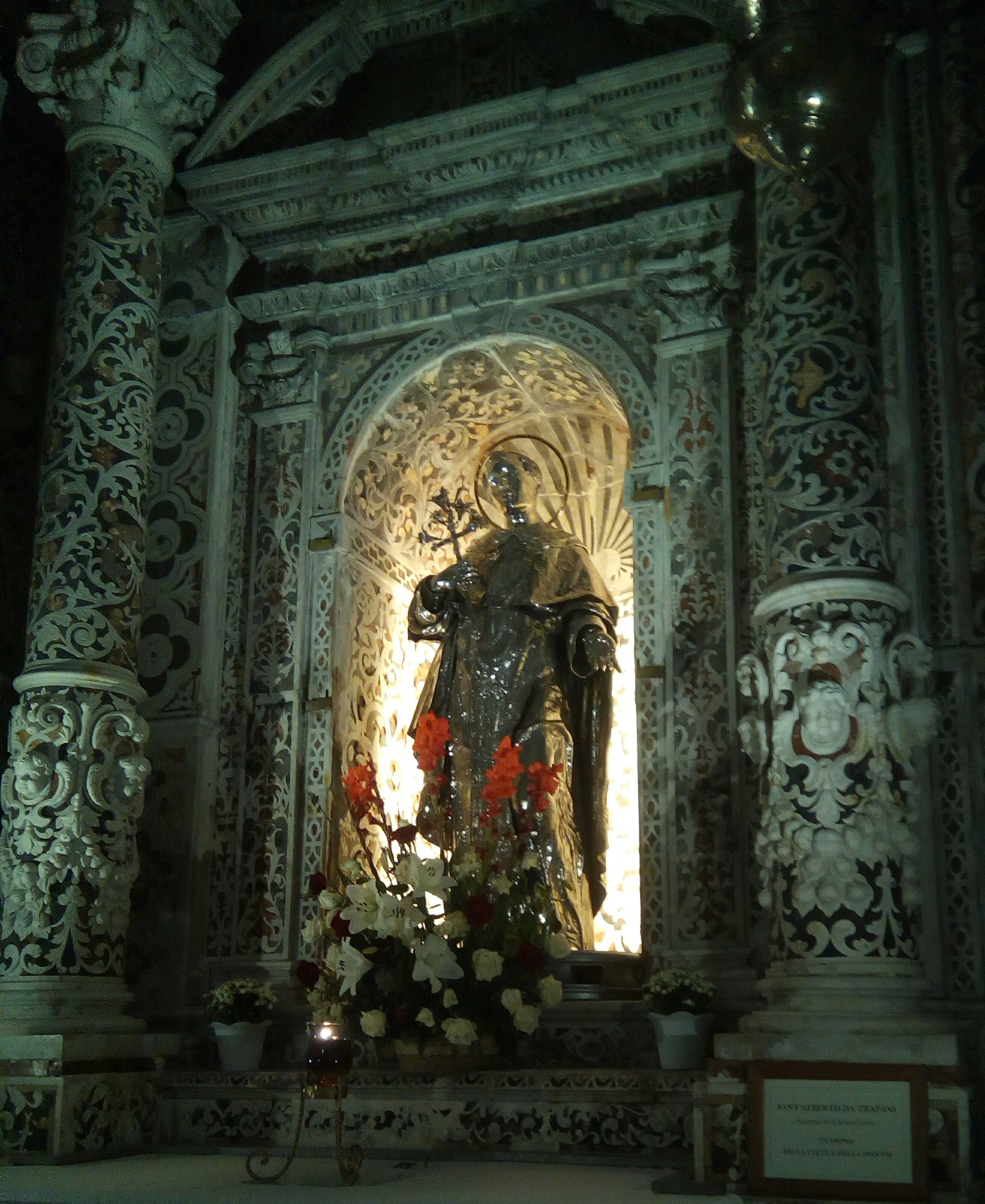
The statue containing the relics of Albert of Trapani.

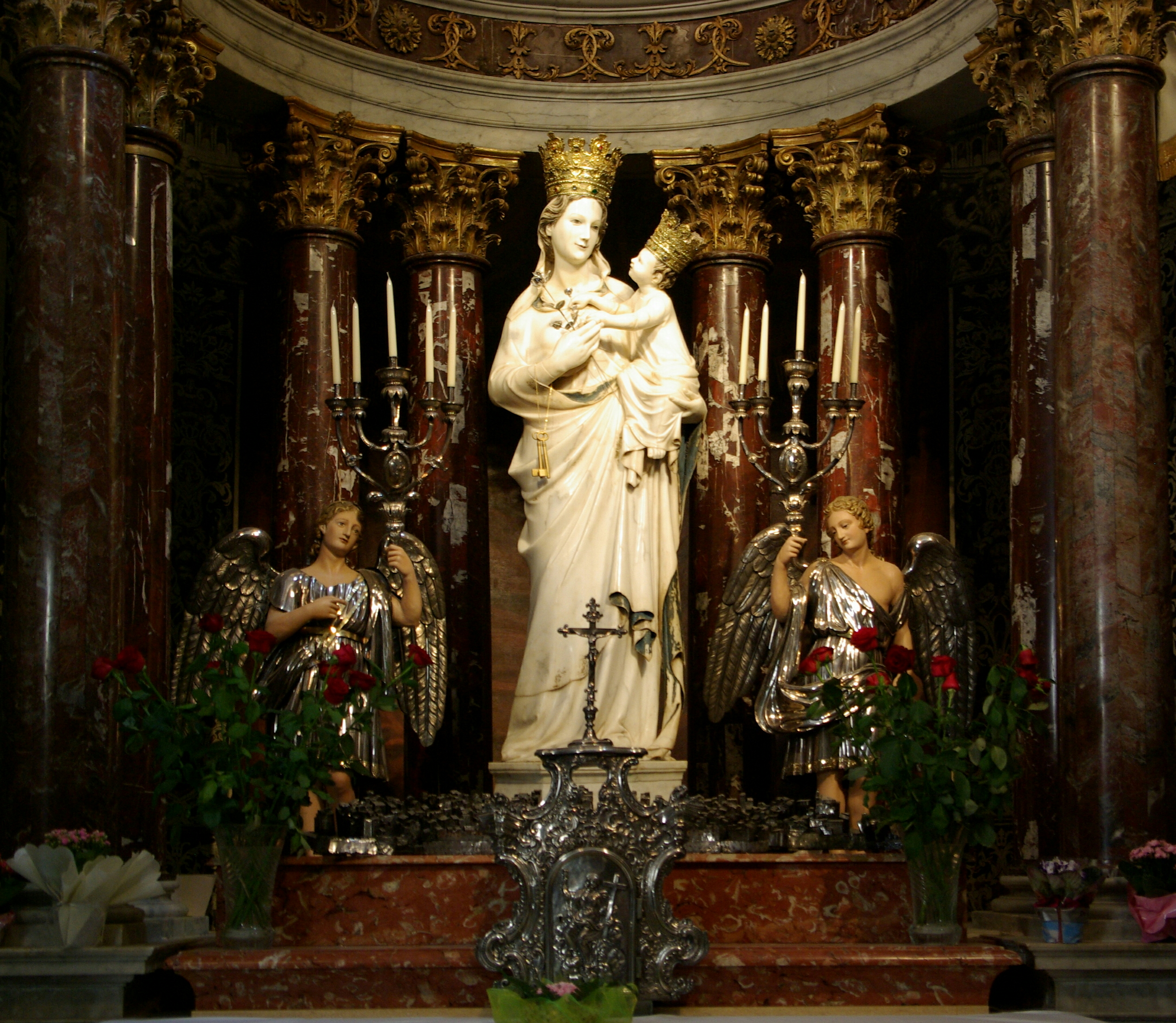
The altar with the statue of the Madonna of Trapani.

=== Swabian–Aragonese period ===
The Carmelites, expelled from Jerusalem and brought to Sicily in 1194, settled in Trapani in the area of the present convent enclosure; the first abbot was Palmerio.

On 20 November 1270 the church hosted for 15 days the mortal remains of Saint Louis IX of France, who had died in Tunis during the Eighth Crusade, together with Cardinal Rodolfo (Raoul Grosparmi), bishop of Albano and a fervent supporter of the campaign against the infidels. Philip III of France ordered the temporary transfer of his father’s remains to the Chapel of Saint Louis of the French in the Cathedral of Santa Maria Nuova in Monreale, and later to the Cathedral Basilica of Saint Denis, in Paris.

According to the 19th-century Trapani historian Giuseppe Maria di Ferro, the church of the Annunziata was completed in 1332, as attested by an inscription in a plaque bearing the date and recorded by Father Daniele della Vergine Maria. Over time the building was enriched with additional works and decorative interventions.

=== Spanish period ===
In 1537 the Chapel of the Madonna of Trapani was completed by the Gagini. It houses the precious statue in Parian marble of the Madonna of Trapani, depicting the Virgin and Child, attributed to Nino Pisano. The statue arrived in Trapani after 1300 and became venerated throughout the Mediterranean.

=== Contemporary period ===
In the eighteenth century the church was enlarged to its present form. The Carmelite prior Vincenzo Ferreri entrusted the decoration of the interior to the Trapani architect Giovanni Biagio Amico, who designed Corinthian-order columns and pilasters without altering the original dimensions of the church. Di Ferro reports that errors in the execution of later works in 1760 caused structural problems in the vault, leaving several marble elements unused.

On 25 March 1950 Pope Pius XII elevated the sanctuary to the title and dignity of a minor basilica.

It is the most famous Marian sanctuary in western Sicily.

== Architecture and furnishings ==
The basilica consists of a single nave terminating in the high altar. In the choir stands a bronze lectern composed of five elements, executed in 1582 by the Trapani sculptor Annibale Scudaniglio, who placed his own portrait and signature on the work. Di Ferro praised the refinement of its ornament, figures and expressive qualities.

Two notable paintings flank the choir: a Martyrdom of Saint Andrew, attributed by Di Ferro to Cavalier Mattia, and a Christ Bearing the Cross by Andrea Carreca, inspired by the Michelangelo statue in Santa Maria sopra Minerva in Rome.

The bell tower on the southern side of the church was designed and directed by the Trapani architect Simone Pisano.

Di Ferro recorded the patronage of several noble families, including the Marchese Fardella and Don Emmanuele Fardella, Prince of Paceco. Other notable patrons were Don Marcello Pepoli e Carafa, the Prince of the Cattolica of the Bosco family, and the Viceroy Count of Albadalista.

=== Façade ===
Rose window and Gothic portal.

Bell tower on the southern side of the façade, a work by Simone Pisano.

=== Interior ===
The nave, with sixteen columns and silvered stuccoes, was transformed in 1742, based on a design by the Trapani architect Giovanni Biagio Amico, in a Baroque–Renaissance style. A radial rose window surmounts the main portal.

- Sanctuary:
  - Chapel of Saint Teresa, formerly of Saint Vitus, on the Gospel side, a space created in 1570.
  - Chapel of the Madonna of Trapani.
    - Triumphal arch. An expression of the Sicilian Renaissance, the monumental entrance arch of the Chapel of the Madonna of Trapani, the marble portal commissioned from Antonello Gagini in 1531 and completed after his death in 1537, was the result of collaboration by his heirs, the brothers Giandomenico, Antonino and Giacomo. In the roundels of the pillars are sculpted the profiles of ten prophets; in the medallions of the pendentives are the representations of the Announcing Angel and the Announced Virgin; in the pediment is the half-figure of God the Father in high relief with a globus cruciger in his left hand, surrounded by winged putti on clouds. On the cimaises lie the full-length statues of Saint Elijah (on the left with the flaming sword) and Saint Elisha (on the right with the book of Scripture). In contrast to the whiteness of Carrara marble, the structure presents rich decoration with acanthus leaves, garlands, festoons, grotesques and rosettes.
    - 1591, Grille, bronze artifact, a gift from the Viceroy of Sicily Diego Enríquez de Guzmán, Count of Albadalista.
    - Statue of the Madonna of Trapani.
  - Fardella Chapel under the title of Saint Albert, a space sponsored by the Fardella family.
    - Silver statue of Saint Albert.
    - 17th century, Martyrdom of Saint Andrew, painting attributed to Mattia Preti.
    - 17th century, Nazarene Embracing the Cross, painting by Andrea Carrera.
- Chapel of the Risen Christ sponsored by the “Merchants of the Marina”, on the Gospel side. The space is also known as the Chapel of the Sailors or Chapel of the Resurrection, used for the custody of the Blessed Sacrament and Eucharistic adoration.
- Chapel of the Fishermen or baptistery.

== Documented works ==
- 1725 c., Immaculate Conception, painting by Giuseppe Felici.

In the nave are canvases depicting the Birth of Mary, Presentation of Mary at the Temple, Visitation, Presentation of Jesus at the Temple, Dormition of Mary, and Assumption of Mary, works by the Jesuit Giuseppe Felici.

- 1735 c., Virgin among the Saints with the depiction of the city of Trapani at her feet, oil on canvas, work by Domenico La Bruna.
- 1582, Lectern, a bronze artifact documented in the choir, work by Annibale Scudaniglio.
- 16th century, The Precursor, that is John the Baptist baptizing Jesus, painting in the style of the Giorgione school in the cornu evangelii of the high altar.
- ?, Faces of Muslims, painting located in the cornu evangelii of the high altar.
- 1486, Font, marble artifact in Renaissance style by an unknown author.
- 1539, Paintings and gildings, documented activities by Francesco Martorana and Orazio d'Alfano “the Perugian”.

=== Statue of the Madonna (Our Lady of Trapani) ===
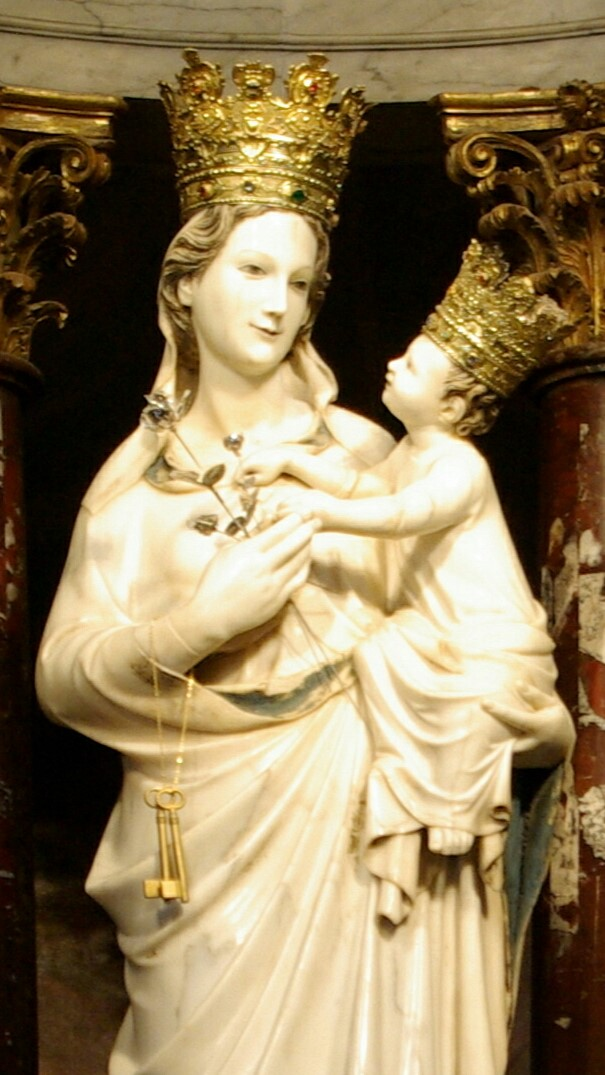
Our Lady of Trapani, detail.

The sanctuary preserves a life-sized marble statue of the Virgin and Child known as the Madonna of Trapani, which was crowned by the Vatican Chapter in 1734. A second coronation was carried out at the request of Pope Pius XII in 1935.

Di Ferro emphasised that the precise circumstances of the statue's arrival in Trapani were already uncertain in his time, owing to the loss of archival sources and the contradictions among later writers. He cited the historian Pirri in noting that both the injury of time and the negligence of writers had obscured its early history. Di Ferro considered the most plausible tradition to place the statue's arrival in Trapani in 1291 under the reign of James II of Aragon, following a route from Cyprus to Ptolemais in Phoenicia and from there to Sicily. He reported a tradition that the statue had originally belonged to a Templar commandery and was left in Trapani at the insistence of the local population.

The "Madonna of Trapani" is venerated both in Italy and abroad. Among the places where devotion exists are Messina, Tonnarella, Palagonia, Palermo, Genoa, and Tunis.

== Cloisters and convent ==
Adjacent to the church is the general convent of the Carmelite fathers, which was the largest of the Order in Italy, with its cloister. The convent is described by Di Ferro as an extensive and isolated complex, accessed by a monumental staircase and organised around spacious corridors and cloisters supported by Doric columns. The cloisters preserved numerous lapidary inscriptions recording royal visits and acts of devotion to the image of the Virgin. It includes:

- A large cloister, with porticoes and loggias, consisting of 80 columns.
  - Plaques bearing inscriptions of Ferdinand III of Bourbon and his son Francis I, Duke of Calabria.
- Northern cloister with the cell–chapel of Saint Albert. On the architrave an inscription reads:

"HÆC FVIT ALBERTI DREPANENSI CÆLVLA SANCTI SISTE GRADVM - ATQVE PIAS PECTORE FVNDITE PRECES".

A second cloister on the northern side contained the cell traditionally associated with Saint Albert of Trapani, later converted into a small chapel. The convent was one of the three general convents of the Carmelite Order, whose prior therefore held voting rights in the general chapters of the order alongside those of Naples and Paris.

Congregation

- 1660 c., Congregation of the Crucifix, known as the Figurella. A confraternity founded with the task of washing the feet of devout pilgrims.

=== Modern use ===
Following the suppression of religious orders in the nineteenth century, the convent buildings were gradually adapted for secular purposes. Today the former convent houses the Agostino Pepoli Regional Museum, a state museum preserving collections of sculpture, painting, decorative arts and archaeology from western Sicily.

== Relics ==
- Saint Albert of Trapani

Inside the church there is a chapel erected in 1586 containing the silver reliquary statue of the Trapani-born Albert of Trapani, made by the silversmith Vincenzo Bonaiuto, which still preserves his relics, including the saint’s entire skull.

== See also ==
- 16th-century Western domes

== Gallery ==
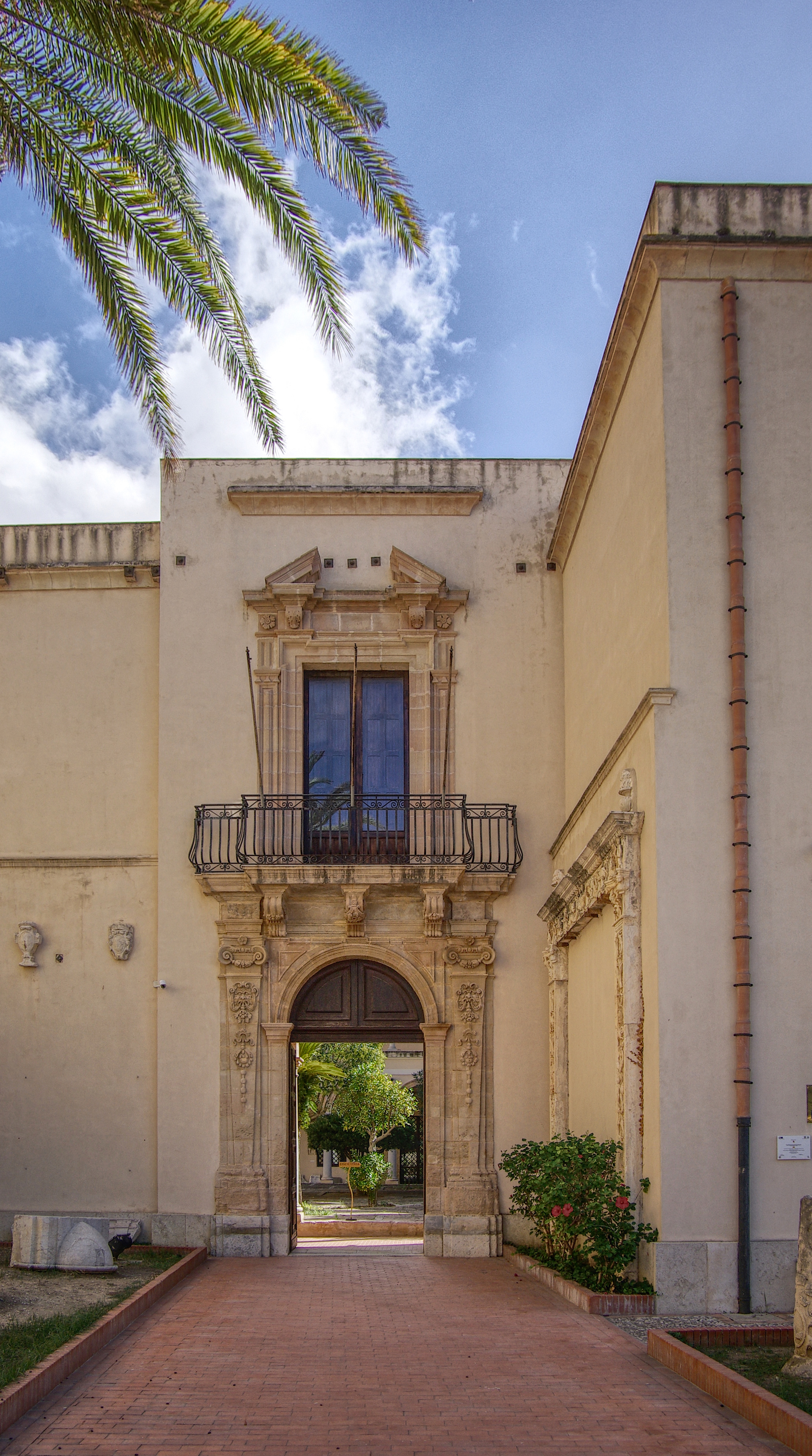
Museum entrance

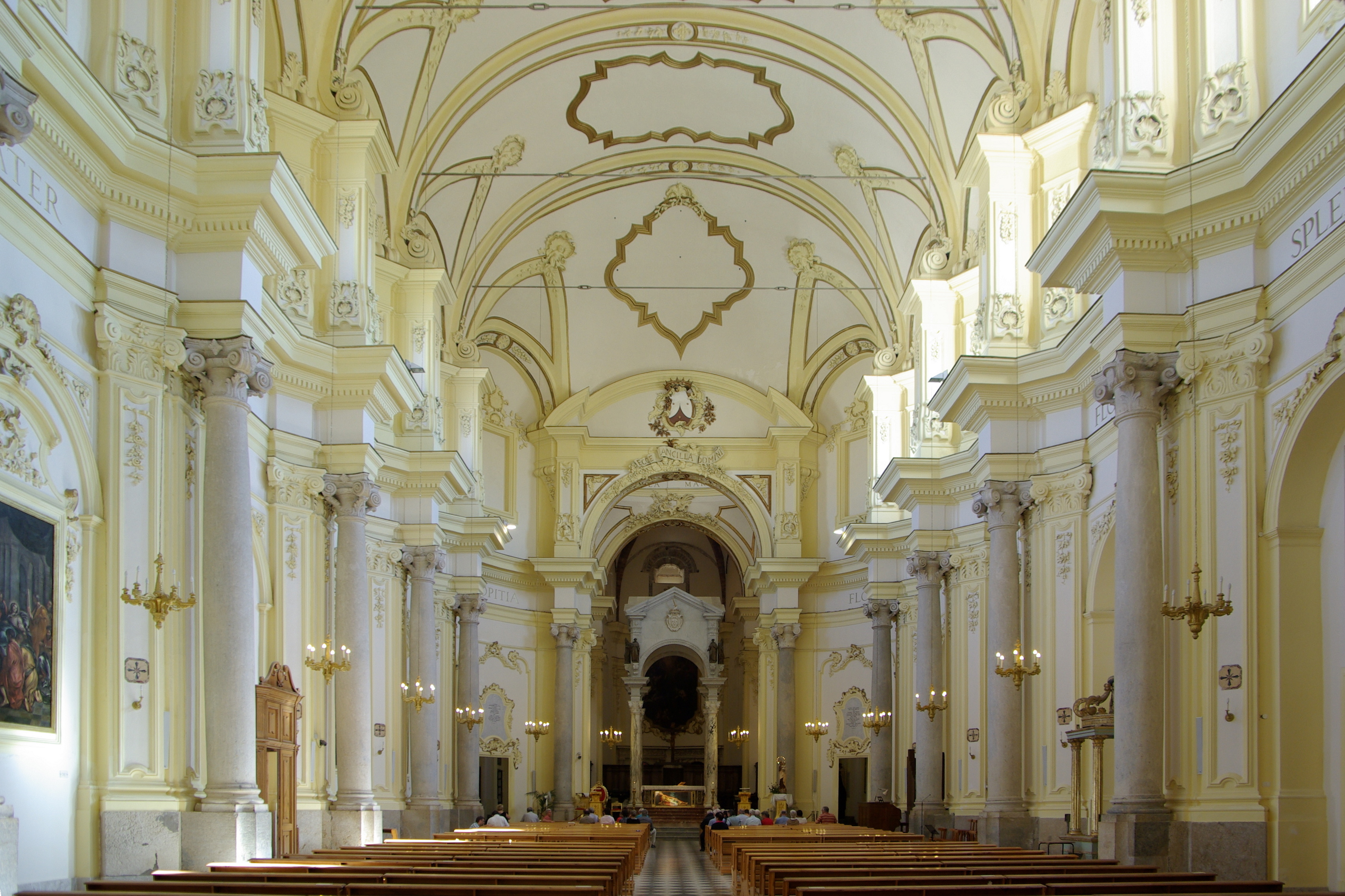
Nave

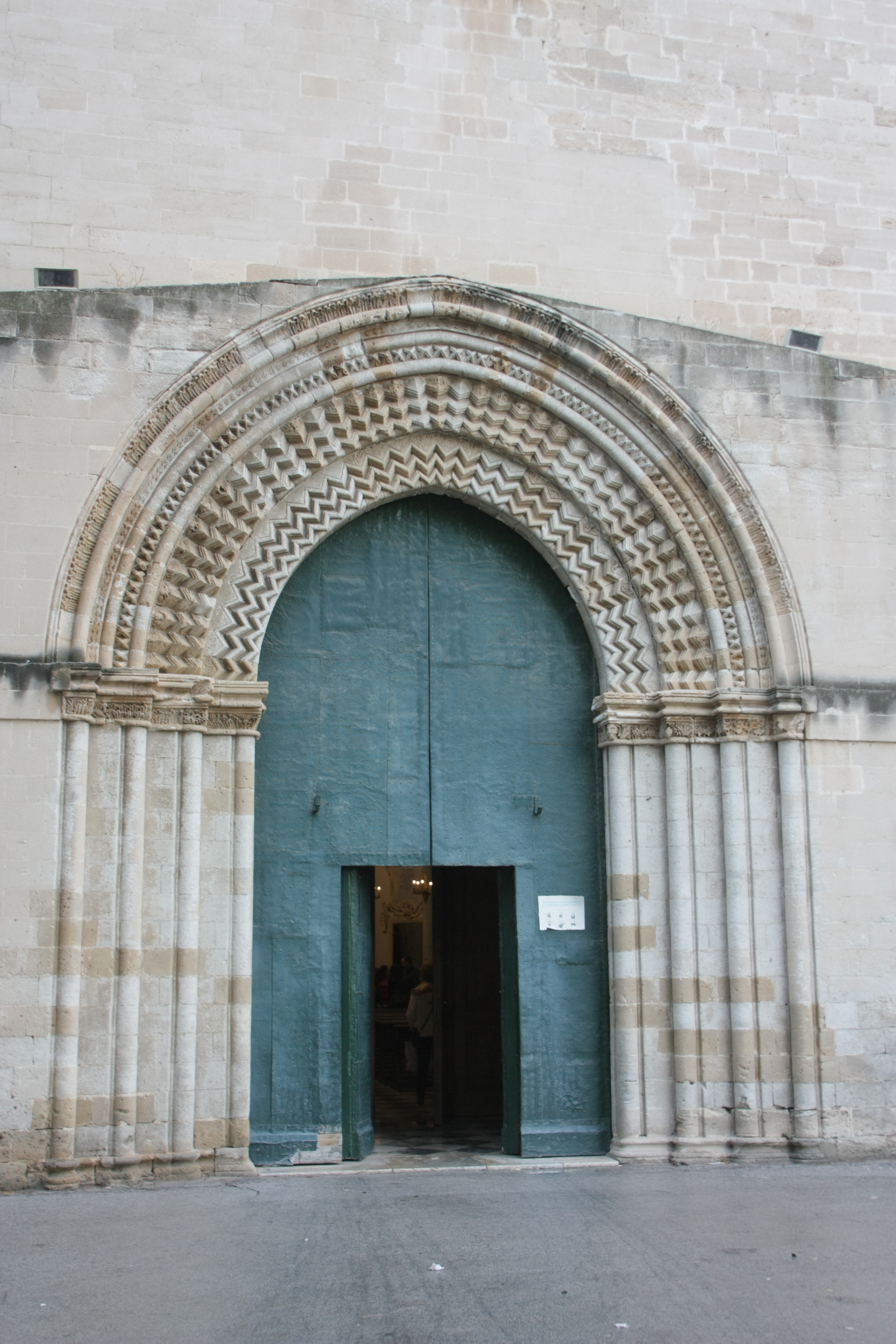
Chiaramonte Gothic portal

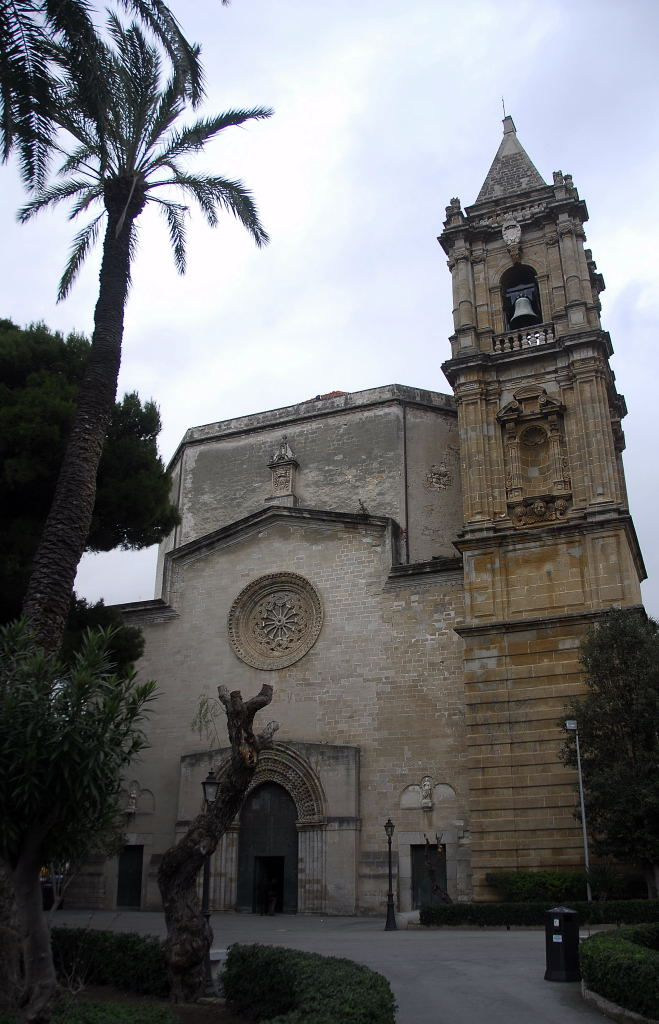
Basilica and garden

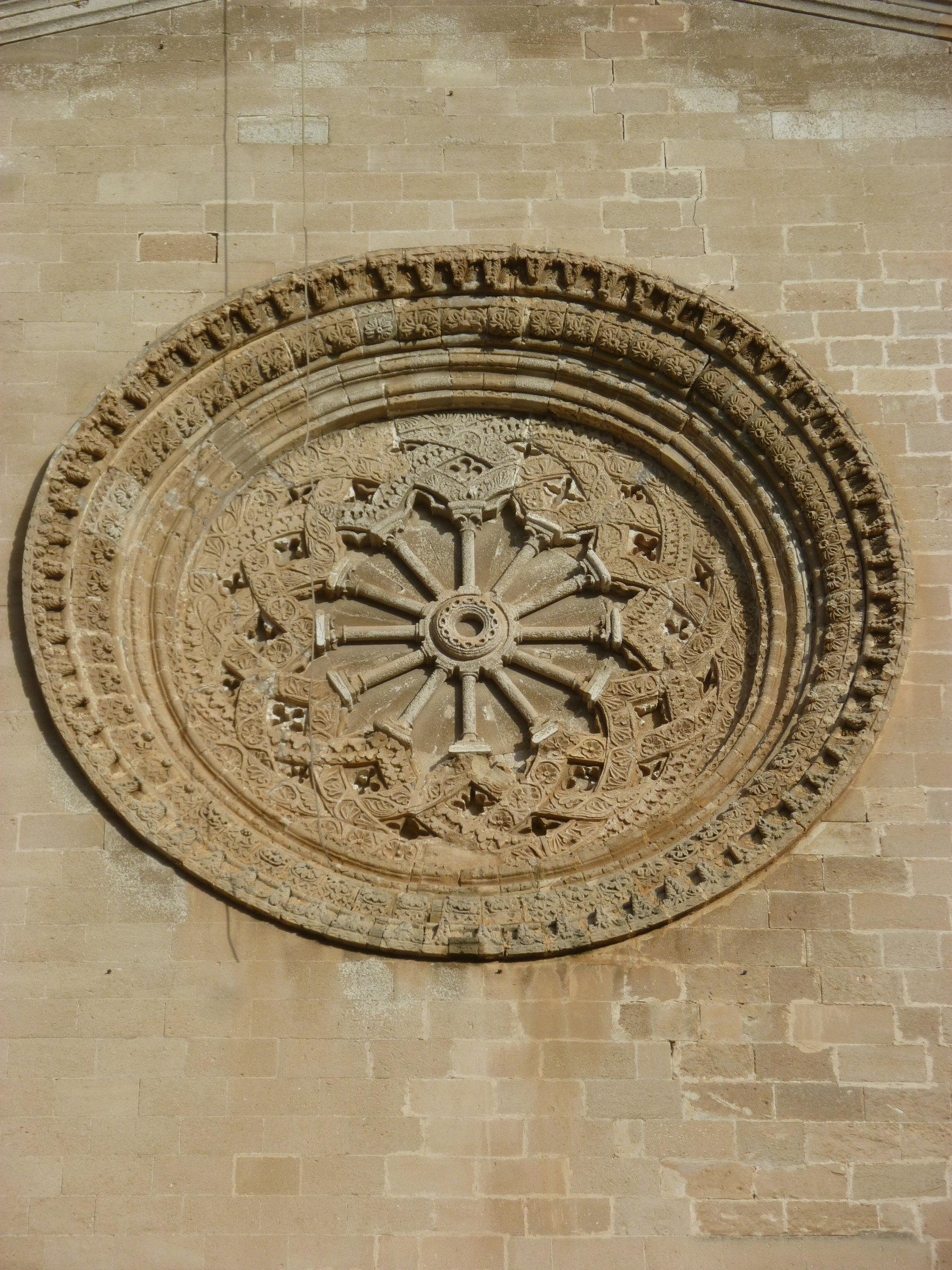
Rose window

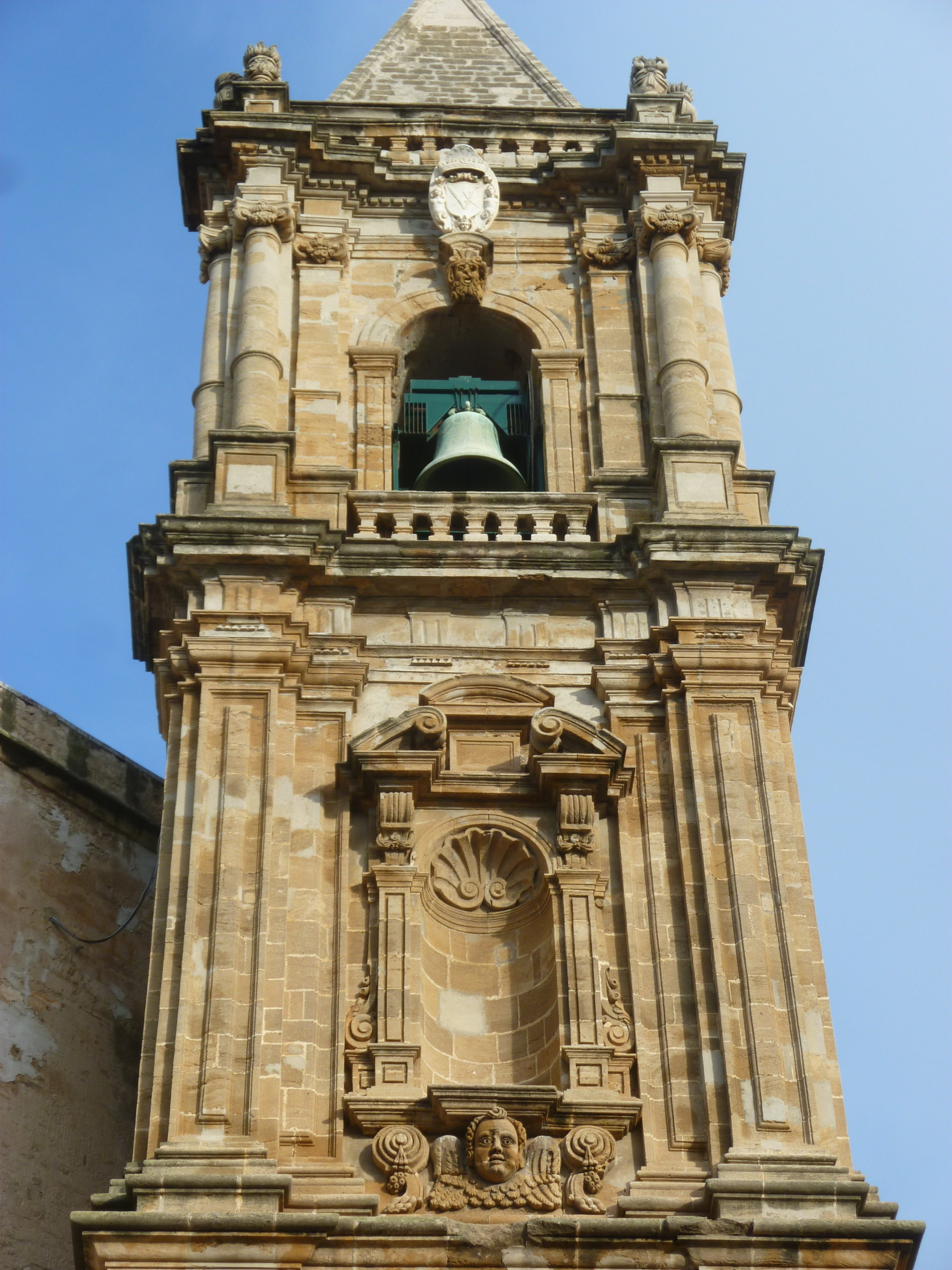
Bell tower designed by Simone Pisano

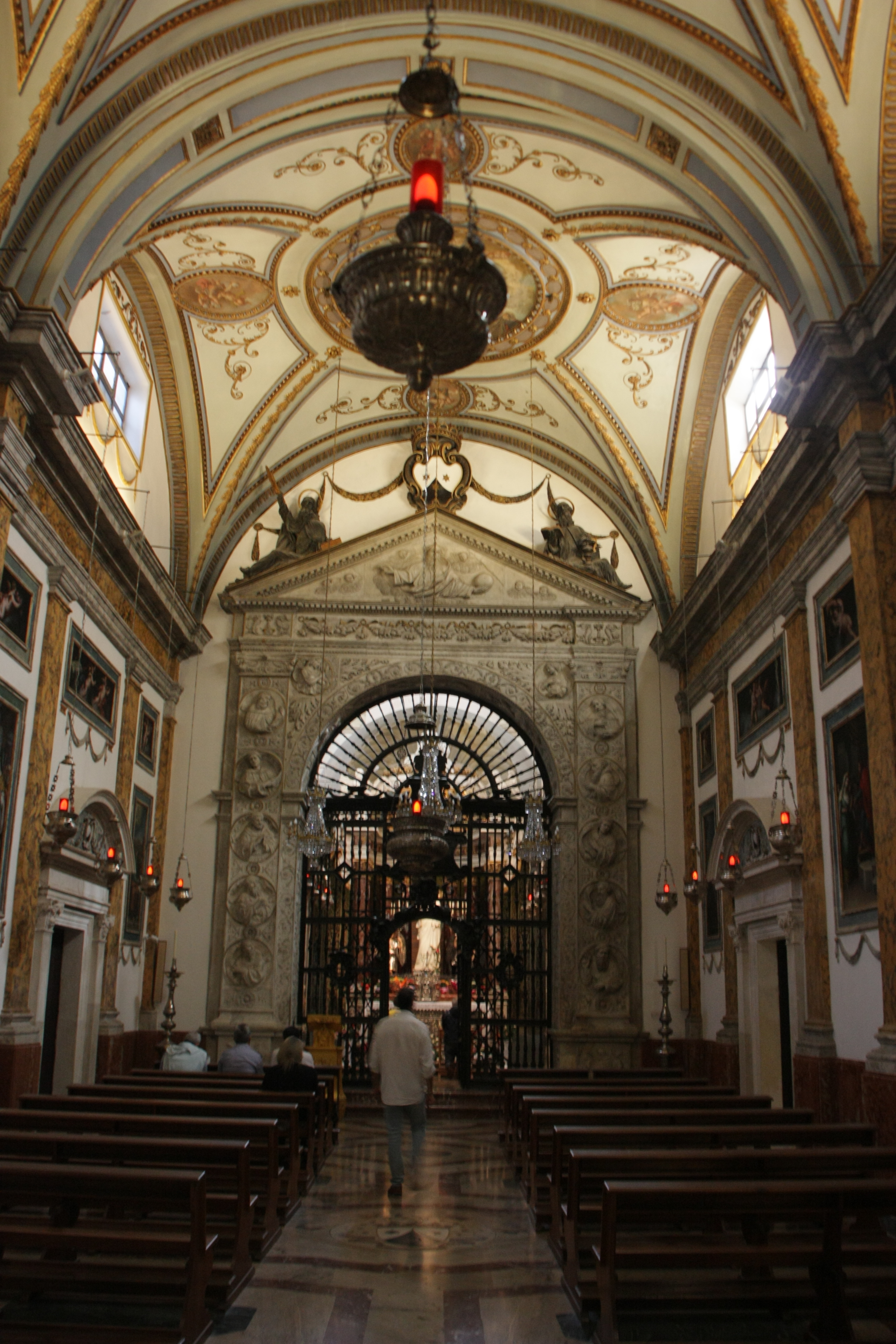
Gagini portal

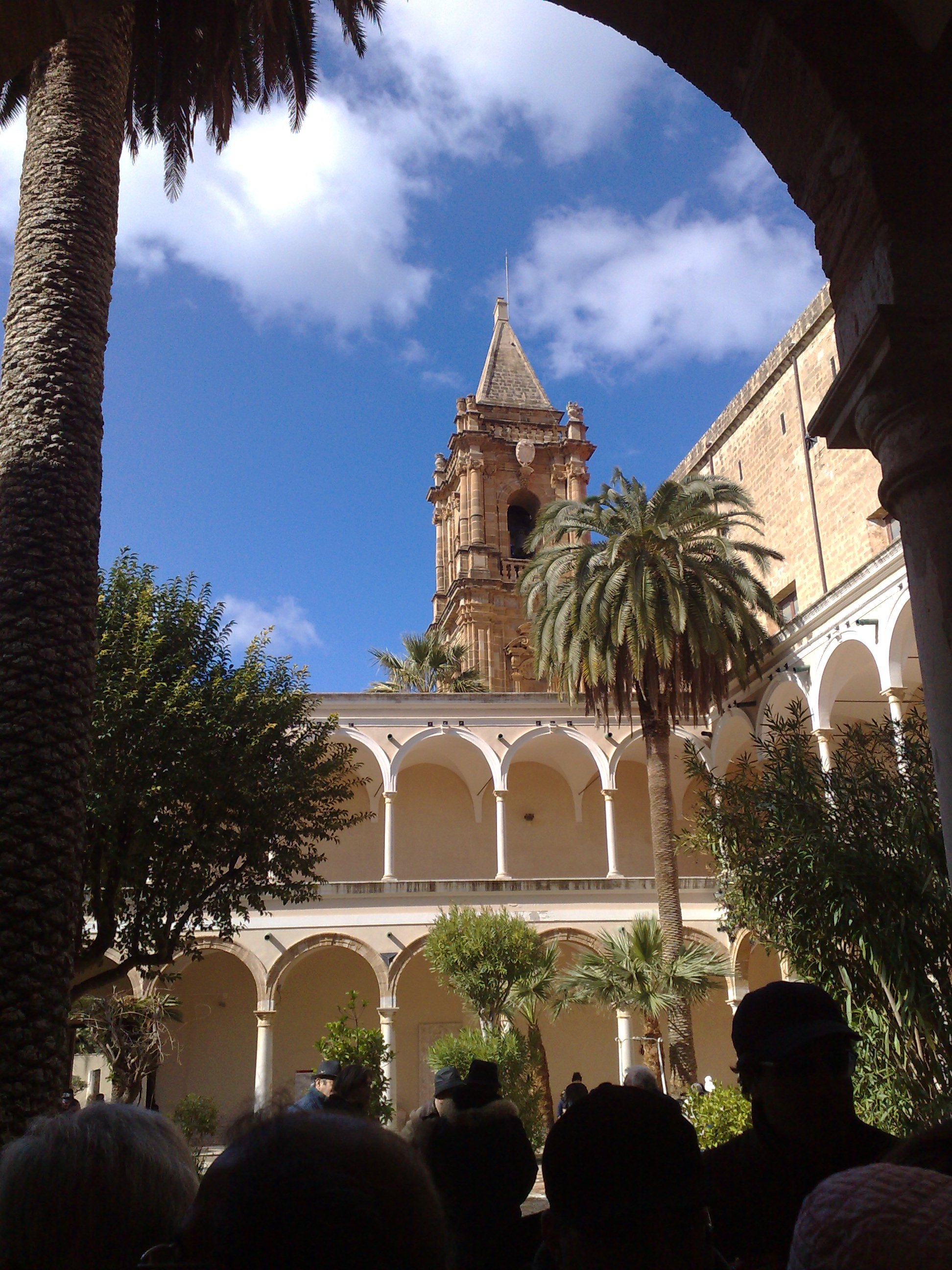
Cloister porticoes

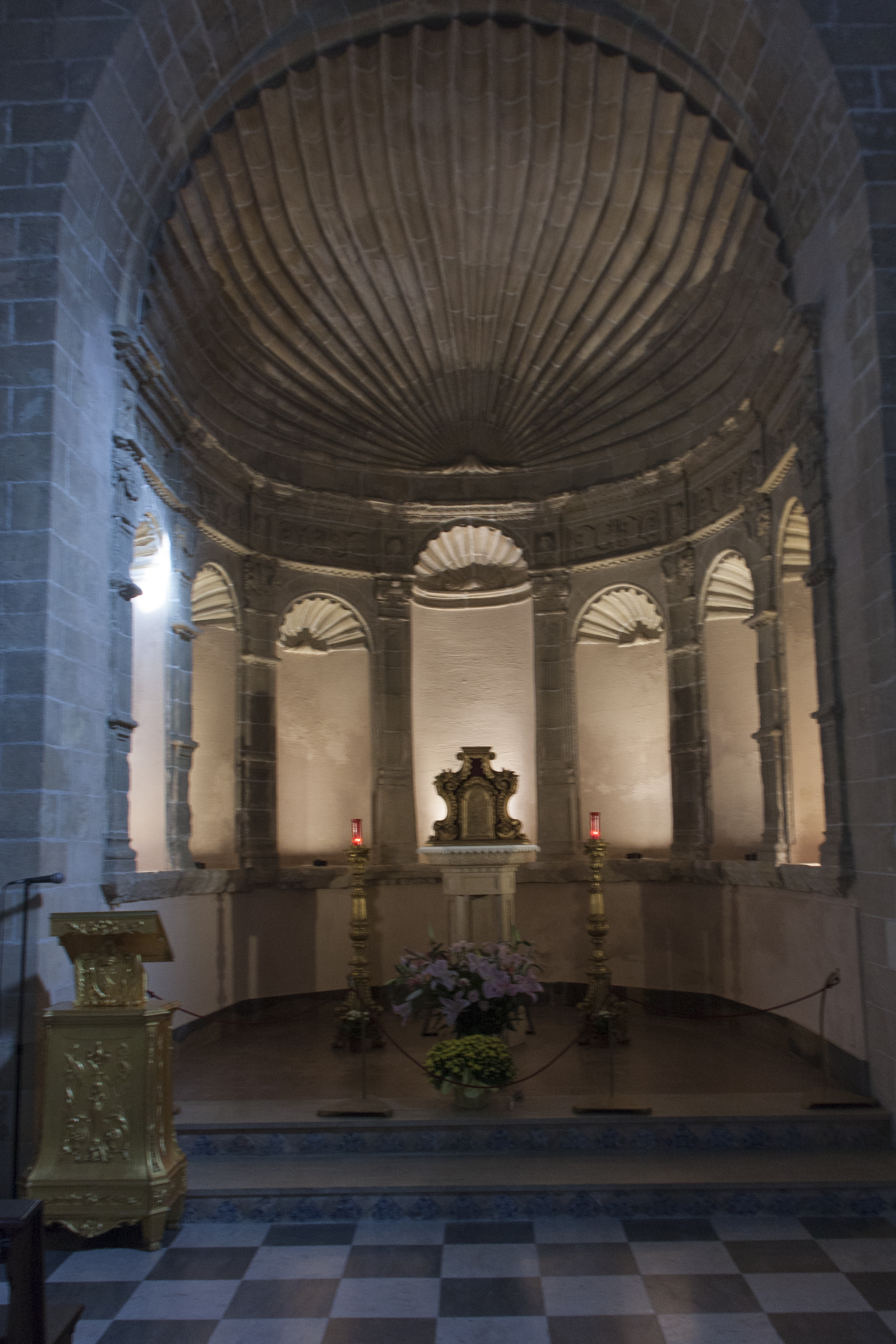
Chapel of the Sailors

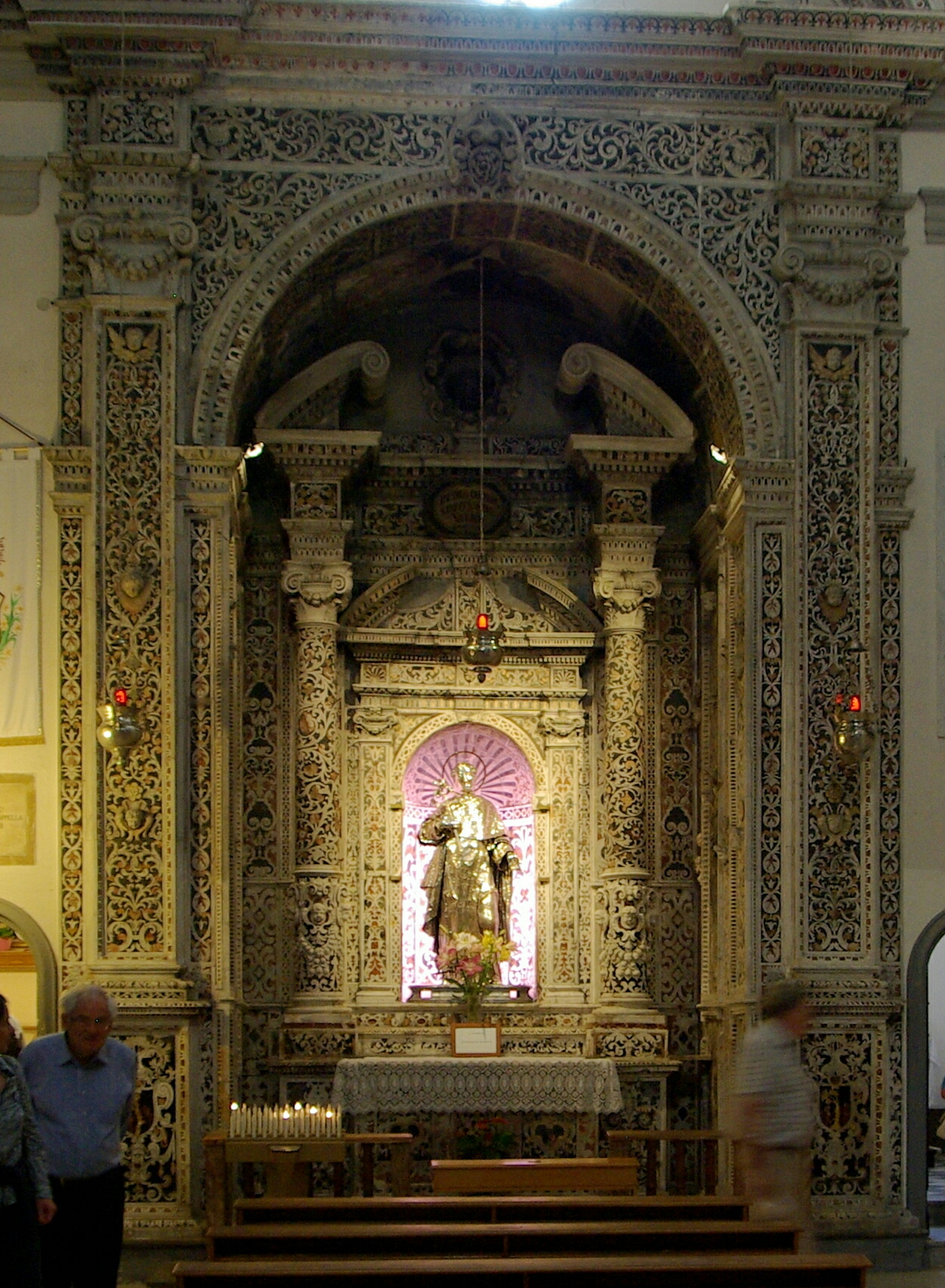
Chapel of Saint Albert of Trapani

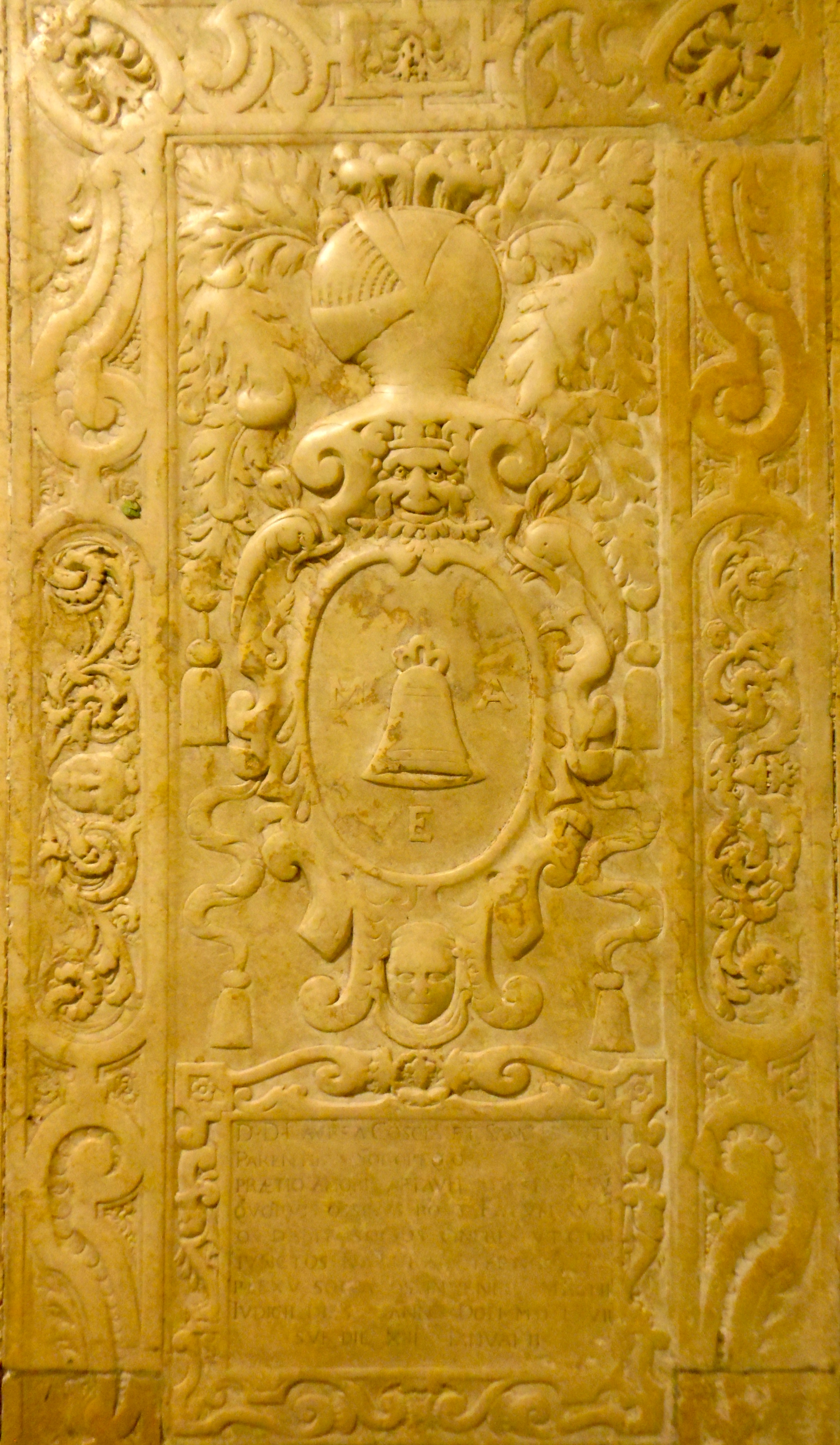
Funerary monument of the Sanclemente family

== See also ==
- Our Lady of Trapani procession (Tunis)
