= Baháʼí Faith in Tunisia =

The Baháʼí Faith in Tunisia begins circa 1910 when the first Baháʼí arrives, possibly from Egypt. In 1956, at Ridván, a marked holy day of the religion and a day on which major elections are held, three new Regional Spiritual Assemblies were established including that of North-West Africa with the chairmanship of Enoch Olinga In 1963, a survey of the community counted 1 assembly and 18 organized groups (between 1 and 9 adults) of Baháʼís in Tunisia. US State Department 2001 estimates mention the Baháʼí community at about 150 persons. However, Association of Religion Data Archives and several other sources point to over 1000 Baháʼís in the country.

== Early phase ==
The first presence of the religion is not well documented but all suggestions point to the arrival of Baháʼís during the ministry of ʻAbdu'l-Bahá which is to say before 1921. It is suggested a Baháʼí visited circa 1910 possibly from Egypt. Frenchman Baháʼí Hippolyte Dreyfus-Barney is known to have obtained permission from the French authorities to have the Baháʼí teachings promulgated in Tunisia. Dreyfus-Barney was remembered by Shoghi Effendi, then head of the religion, for his "stimulating encouragement" to the Baháʼí community of Tunis. Later, Hafez Nadim Effendi, who died in 1933, was similarly encouraged by Shoghi Effendi to twice visit Tunis to teach and encourage the Baháʼís. Circa 1928 the first Bahaʼi pilgrim from Tunis and a representative of its Baháʼí Local Spiritual Assembly visited the Baháʼí spiritual and administrative centers of the religion. In 1937 Dr. M. Sálih, chairman of the National Spiritual Assembly of Egypt, visited Tunis again based on the encouragement of the head of the religion with a view to strengthening the Baháʼís in Tunisia and encouraging their activities.

In 1956 at Ridván, a marked holy day of the religion and a day on which major elections are held, three new Regional Spiritual Assemblies were established including that of North-West Africa with the chairmanship of Enoch Olinga covering Tunisia with its secretarial seat in Tunis. Another well known Baháʼí who served the area and that assembly at the time was Helen Elsie Austin. The assembly was established covering about 600 Baháʼís and 38 local assemblies across northwestern Africa. The seat of the national assembly was later transferred from Tunis to Rabat, Morocco. The regional national assembly including Tunisia achieved incorporation in 1961.

== Growth ==
A survey of the religion taken in 1963 found an Assembly in Tunis, groups between 1 and 9 adults in 18 locations, and an additional 6 locations isolated Baháʼís lived.

Local Spiritual Assembly	Tunis					
Organized Groups of Baháʼís	Ben Arous	Douz	El Djem	Gafsa	Kebili	Kasserine
	Ksour Essef	Le Kef	Makthar	Manouba	Megrine	Rades
	Remada	Robaa	Sbeitla	Sidi Bouzid	Siliana	Sousse

During 1967–69 the regional assembly was reorganized and had jurisdiction over Algeria and Tunisia. When the pioneers to Tunisia were expelled in November 1968 the Attar-Hamedani family left behind a villa and office before eventually settling in Hong Kong. In 1969 the regional national assembly of North Africa was dissolved when Tunisia was placed under emergency rule. The National Spiritual Assembly of Tunisia was elected in 1972.

=== Persecution ===
In October 1984 Baháʼí institutions were banned and Baháʼís were interrogated in Tunisia. In the mid-1980s 6 known polemical attacks were made against the Baháʼís in Tunisia in newspapers. Near the same period Abdelfattah Amor served as dean of the faculty of legal, political and social science at Tunis University. He would later work professionally as a human rights lawyer who, as a Muslim, would serve as a UN Special Rapporteur who took a keen interest in the treatment of the Baháʼís of Iran. In the same period Muhammad Talbí, a professor of the Letters and Human Sciences at Tunis University, published an article "What Muslims Really Believe About Religious Liberty" in Liberty, a magazine of religious freedom, in 1986. Though it didn't mention the religion specifically it was considered significant enough that Baháʼís reprinted the article with permission in their publication the Baháʼí News in January 1987.

Traditionally the government regarded the religion as a heretical sect of Islam and permitted its adherents to practice their faith only in private.

== Modern community ==
In 2005, a Tunisian Muslim academic, Dr. Iqbal Al-Gharbi, a psychology lecturer at the University of Ez-Zitouna in Tunis, called on Muslims to reconcile with Baháʼís and other religious groups, even to "apologise to the Baha'is that have been humiliated and denigrated in Muslim countries."

The modern Baháʼí community has been alittle in the news since the Arab Spring by commentators interested in events in Tunisia. A series entitled "Tunisia's Spiritual Pluralism" covered the religion in February 2013. It noted that though the Bahá's have "not been overtly persecuted by the Tunisian state, they nonetheless often feel socially marginalized and excluded".

=== Demographics ===
2001 estimates by the US Department of State counted some 150 Baháʼís. However, World Christian Encyclopedia (2001) claimed that the number of Baháʼís in Tunisia was 1,450 in 1990. The Association of Religion Data Archives estimated 2,000 Baháʼís in 2010. A recent mention in a newspaper quoted a Baháʼí estimating that more than a thousand exist in Tunisia.

Though the government has proscribed the religion publicly, it has permitted Baháʼís to hold meetings of their national council in private homes as well as three local spiritual assemblies that have been elected since 2004.

== Religious reference to Tunisia ==
Referring to Revelation, Verses 3, ʻAbdu'l-Bahá provided an interpretation referring to the Umayyad Caliphate regions including Tunisia: "And there appeared a great wonder in heaven; and behold a great red dragon, having seven heads and ten horns, and seven crowns upon his heads. … These signs are an allusion to the dynasty of the Umayyads who dominated the Islamic religion. Seven heads and seven crowns mean seven countries and dominions over which the Umayyads had power: they were the Roman dominion around Damascus; and the Persian, Arabian and Egyptian dominions, together with the dominion of Africa—that is to say, Tunis, Morocco and Algeria; the dominion of Andalusia, which is now Spain; and the dominion of the Turks of Transoxania. The Umayyads had power over these countries." Such an interpretation of history does not negate the affirmation of the exalted station held for Muhammad - ʻAbdu'l-Bahá said that a Baháʼí will choose death over denial of any of the great Prophets, whether Moses, Muhammad or Christ. Baháʼís place Islam as the penultimate religion before the end times, which the Báb ultimate addressed by claiming to be the Qa'im himself followed by Baháʼu'lláh claiming to be the return of Christ.

== See also ==
- Religion in Tunisia
- History of Tunisia
