= Albert of Trapani =

Italian Roman Catholic saint

Saint Albert of Trapani OCarm
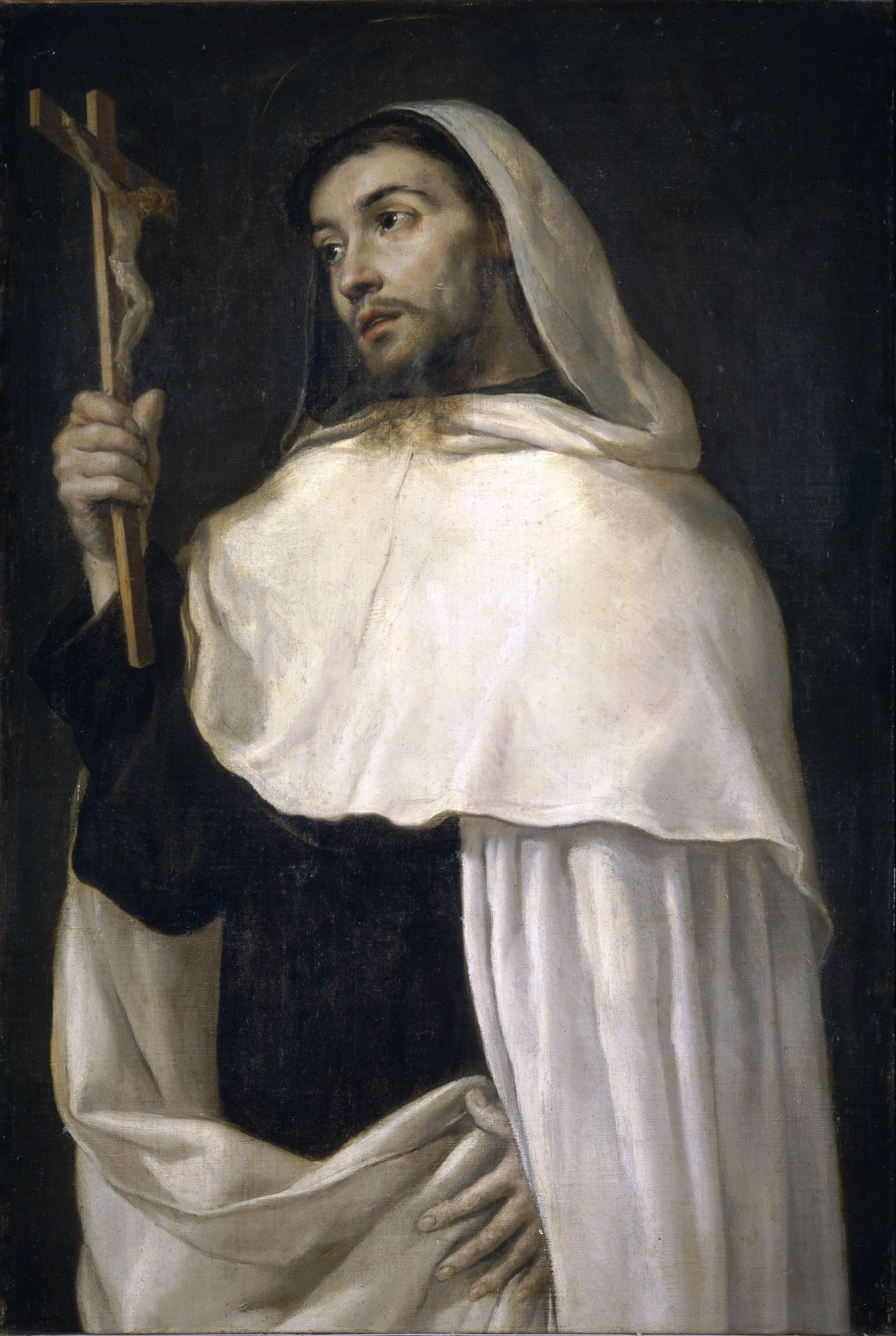
- Painting by Antonio de Pereda, 17th century
- Born: Alberto degli Abati c. 1240; Trapani, Sicily
- Died: 7 August 1307 (aged 67); Messina, Sicily
- Venerated in: Roman Catholic Church
- Beatified: 1454 by Pope Nicholas V
- Canonized: 31 May 1476 by Pope Sixtus IV
- Feast: 7 August
- Patronage: Trapani, Carmelite schools, Palermo

Albert of Trapani (born Albert degli Abati; Sicilian: Sant’Albertu di l’Abati; c. 1240 – 7 August 1307) was an Italian Roman Catholic priest and a professed member of the Carmelites. He practiced great austerities upon himself to make himself poor in the spirit of Jesus Christ and went out preaching and evangelizing; he was known for working and maintaining a positive relationship with Jews as well as for his powers of healing. The saint was likewise attributed for the 1301 lifting of the siege in Messina that could have seen hundreds die from starvation had it not been for his intervention.

His beatification received approval in 1454 from Pope Nicholas V and he was canonized sometime later in mid-1476; some sources suggest that Pope Callixtus III canonized the saint on 15 October 1457.

== Life ==
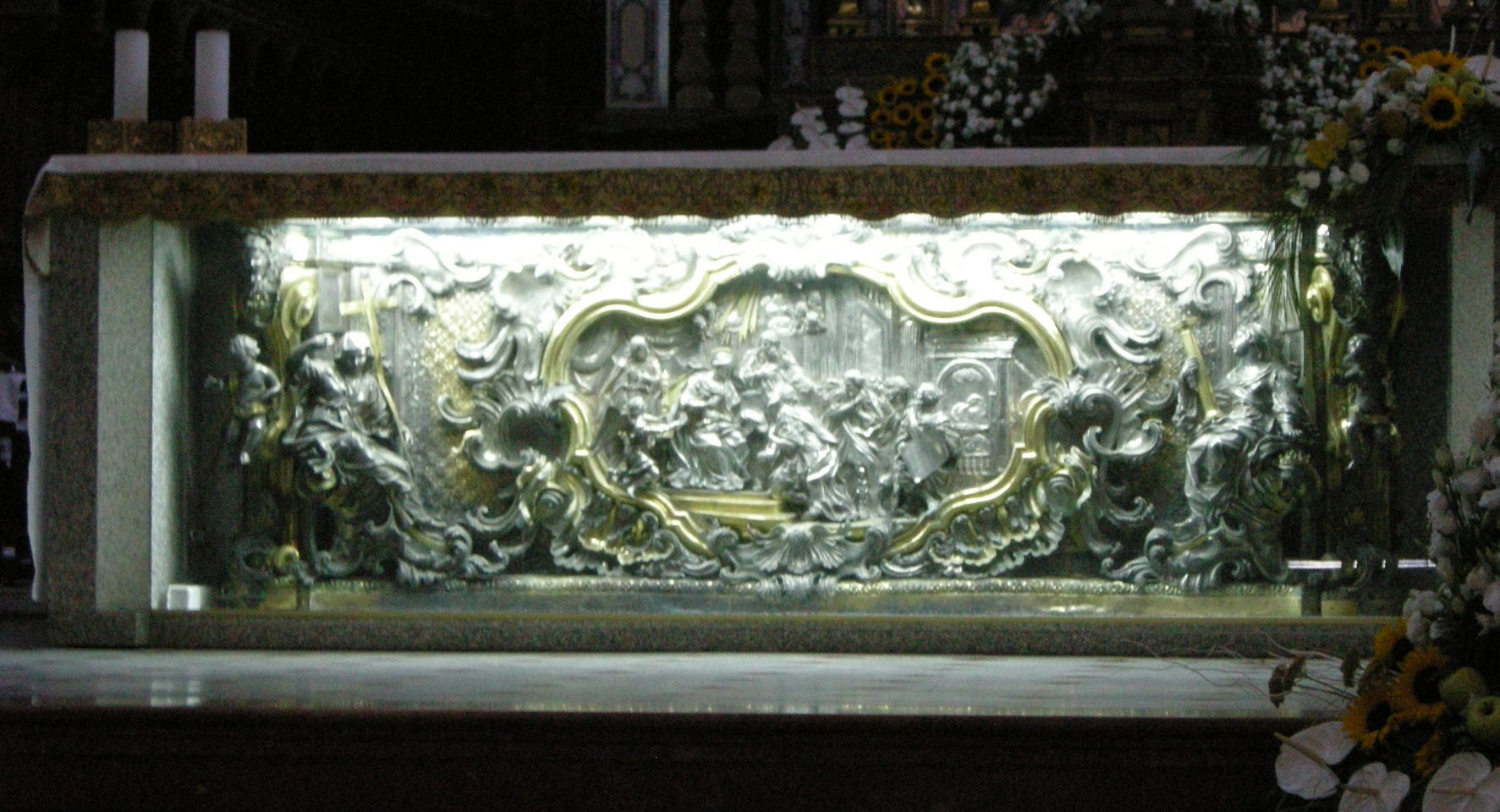
Tomb in Messina.

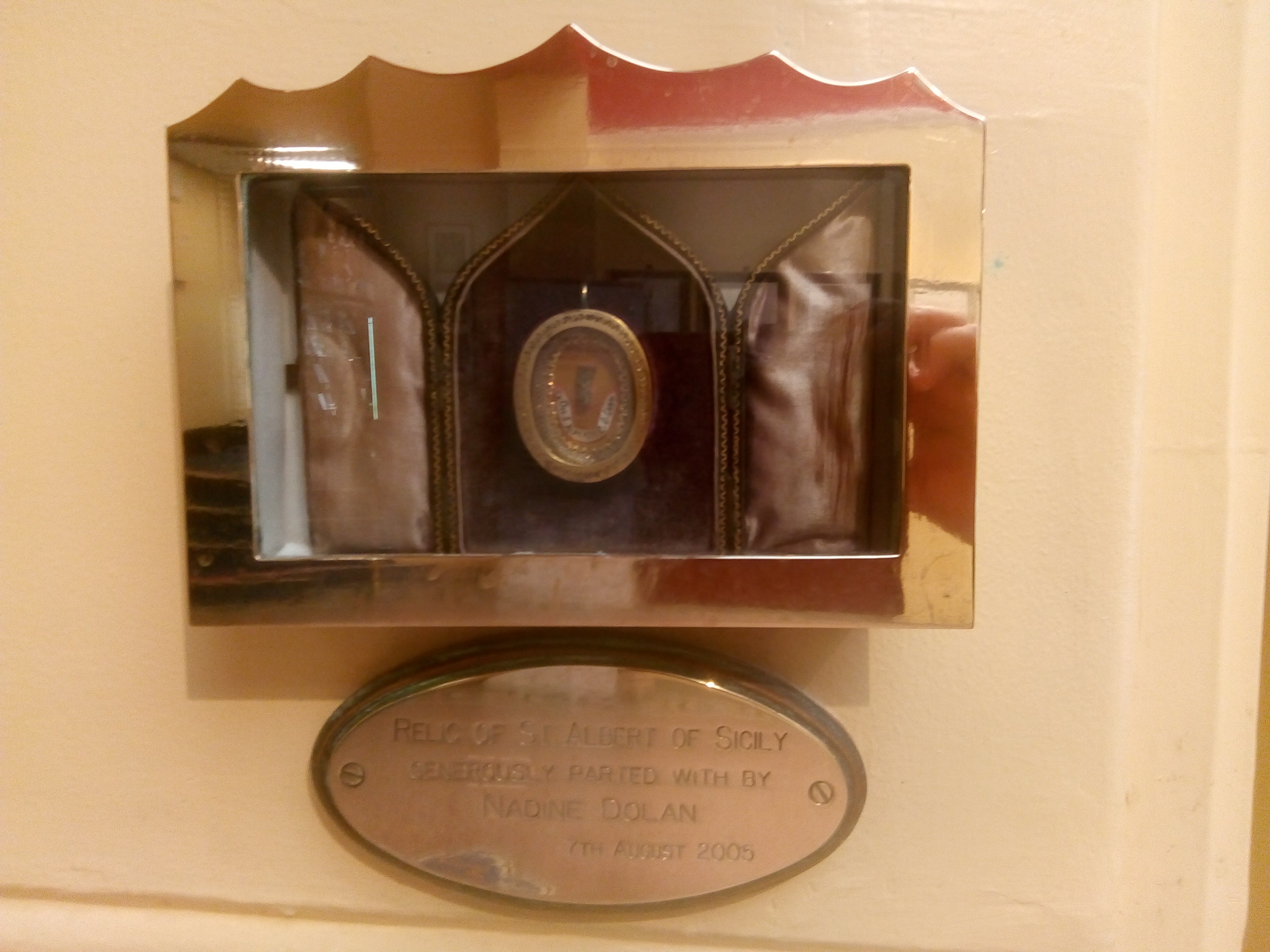
Relic of St Albert in Whitefriar Street Carmelite Church, Dublin

Alberto degli Abati was born circa 1240 in Trapani as the sole child to the nobles Benedetto degli Abati and Giovanna Palizi. His father served as an admiral in the fleet of Frederick II of Hohensautfen. His parents - who married in 1214 - were sterile and promised that if blessed to have a son he would be consecrated to the Beata Vergine Maria del Monte Carmelo. In his childhood his father had thought of arranging a marriage for him but his mother was able to remind her husband to adhere to the vow the couple made that he be consecrated to the Lord.

He received his education from the Carmelites and around this time set his heart on commencing his ecclesial studies for the priesthood so as to serve Jesus Christ and his fellow man and woman. He entered the convent in 1258 to join the order before his ordination in Trapani and his transfer to the order's house at Messina and he served as a mendicant preacher to the Sicilian people. He worked alongside Jews and converted some while collaborating with others and tending to their needs. He served from 1280 until 1287 as the provincial for Trapani and as the provincial for Messina from 1287 until 1296 when he was named as the provincial superior for the Sicilian region of his order; he held that position until his death a decade later. He sometimes practiced exorcisms. He often mixed bitter wormwood with his food and drink to make them less pleasant to the taste and to mortify his sense of taste. He once saved three Jews from drowning near Agrigento and once cured a Jewish boy from epilepsy in Sciacca.

The lifting of a siege at Messina is attributed to him. In 1301 the town was under siege and blockaded after Duke Robert of Calabria entered. He responded to the pleas for succor and went on to celebrated Mass as a plea for the deliverance of God. Once he finished three ships loaded with grain ran the blockade thus saving Messina from starvation as Duke Robert lifted the siege.

He died at a convent in Messina. Tradition records an argument between the faithful and the priests regarding plans for his funeral since the faithful wanted to celebrate him as a saint while the priests wanted a normal Requiem Mass. The argument ceased when angels appeared siding with the people confirming the late friar as a confessor of the faith. His remains were moved at one stage either in 1309 though most sources suggest it was done in 1317.

The Whitefriar Street Carmelite Church in Dublin contains some of his relics. His liturgical feast sees a relic of the saint dipped into the water of Saint Albert's Well (in Agrigento) and the Carmelites say that those who piously use the water receive healing of mind and body, through the intercession of Albert. His flask that contained wormwood is in Corleone and the stone he used as his pillow is in Petralia Soprana. His skull is contained in a silver statue crafted in the 1700s (the engraver Vincenzo Bonaiuto did this) for the saint's altar in the Trapani Marian basilica after being moved from Messina. Teresa of Ávila and Maria Maddalena de' Pazzi had strong devotions to him. Battista Spagnoli composed a Sapphic ode in his honor and a gate in Messina was named after him in 1623. Vincenzo Barbaro and Theodore de Aquis were just two of some who wrote biographies on the late saint.

There are sources that suggest Pope Callixtus III either canonized or beatified him through verbal consent on 15 October 1457 but it is believed for the most part that Pope Sixtus IV approved the canonization in a papal bull signed on 31 May 1476. It is likewise believed that Pope Nicholas V beatified him in 1454.

== See also ==
- Saint Albert of Trapani, patron saint archive
