= Whitefriar Street Carmelite Church =

- Church of Our Lady of Mount Carmel and Shrine of Saint Valentine
- Séipéal Cairmilíteach, Sráid na mBráithre Bána
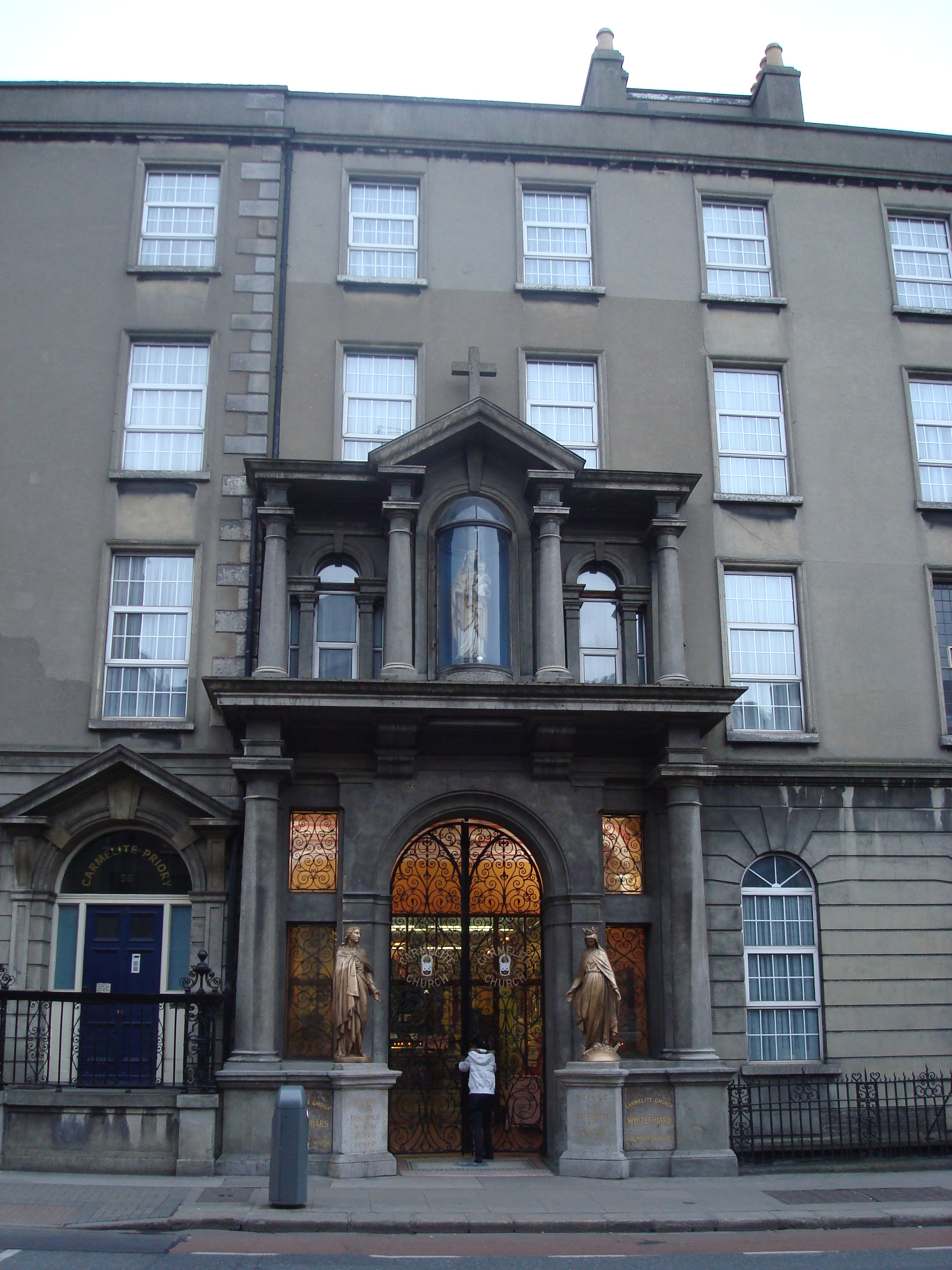

- Location within Central Dublin
- 53°20′23″N 6°16′01″W
- Location: 56 Aungier Street
- Country: Ireland
- Denomination: Catholic
- Tradition: Roman Rite
- Religious institute: Carmelites
- Website: whitefriarstreetchurch.com

History
- Dedication: Our Lady of Mount Carmel
- Consecrated: 11 November 1827

Architecture
- Architect: George Papworth
- Groundbreaking: 1826
- Construction cost: £4,000

Specifications
- Capacity: 2,000
- Length: 83 metres (272 ft)
- Width: 24 metres (79 ft)
- Materials: limestone, marble

Administration
- Archdiocese: Dublin
- Deanery: Cullenswood
- Parish: Whitefriar Street

Whitefriar Street Carmelite Church is a Roman Catholic church in Dublin, Ireland maintained by the Carmelite order. The church is noted for having the relics of Saint Valentine, which were donated to the church in the 19th century by Pope Gregory XVI from their previous location in the cemetery of St. Hippolytus in Rome.

The church is on the site of a pre-Reformation Carmelite priory built in 1539.

The current structure dates from 1825 and was designed by George Papworth, who also designed St. Mary's Pro-Cathedral in Dublin. It was extended and enlarged in 1856 and 1868.

The church also contains relics of St. Albert, a Sicilian who died in 1306. On his feast day (7 August), a relic of the saint is dipped into the water of St. Albert's Well, and the Carmelites say that those who piously use the water receive healing of both body and mind through the intercession of St. Albert.

The church also contains a life-size oak figure of Our Lady of Dublin.

The 1825 building features in Fisher's Drawing Room Scrap Book, 1833 as The Church of the Carmelite Friary., an engraving of a painting by George Petrie of the interior being accompanied by a poetical illustration by Letitia Elizabeth Landon.

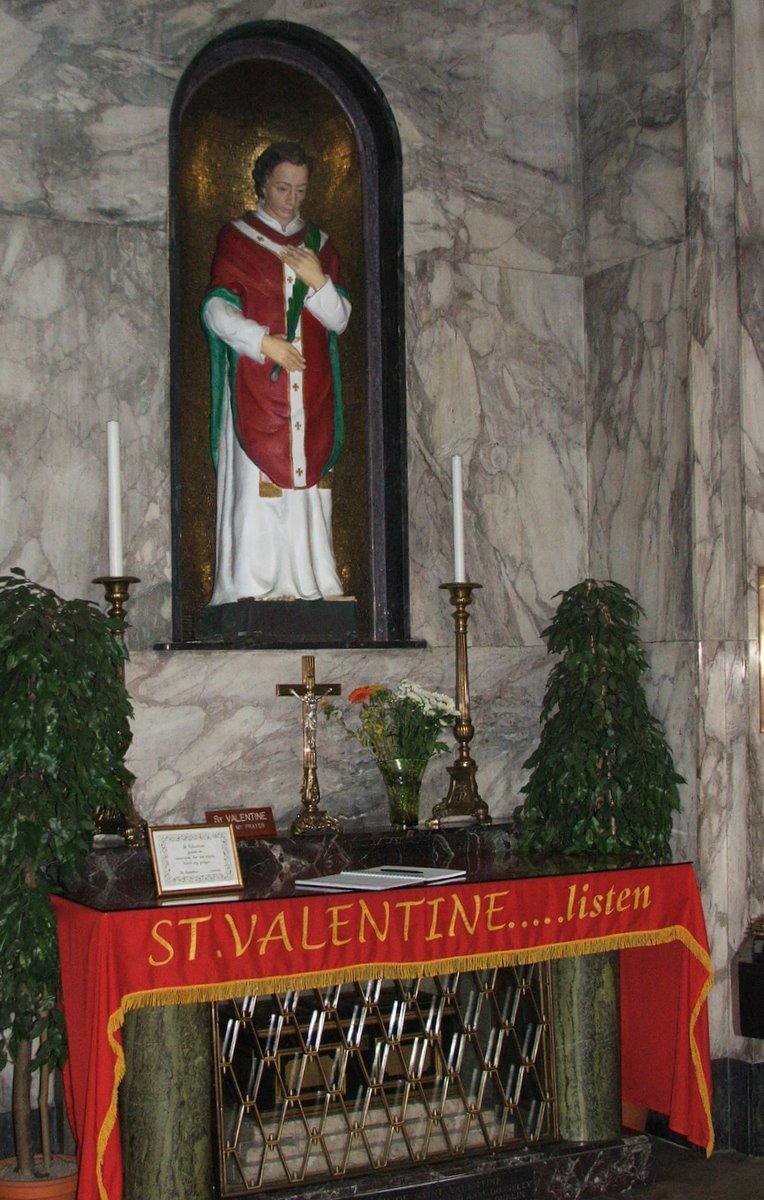
Shrine of St. Valentine

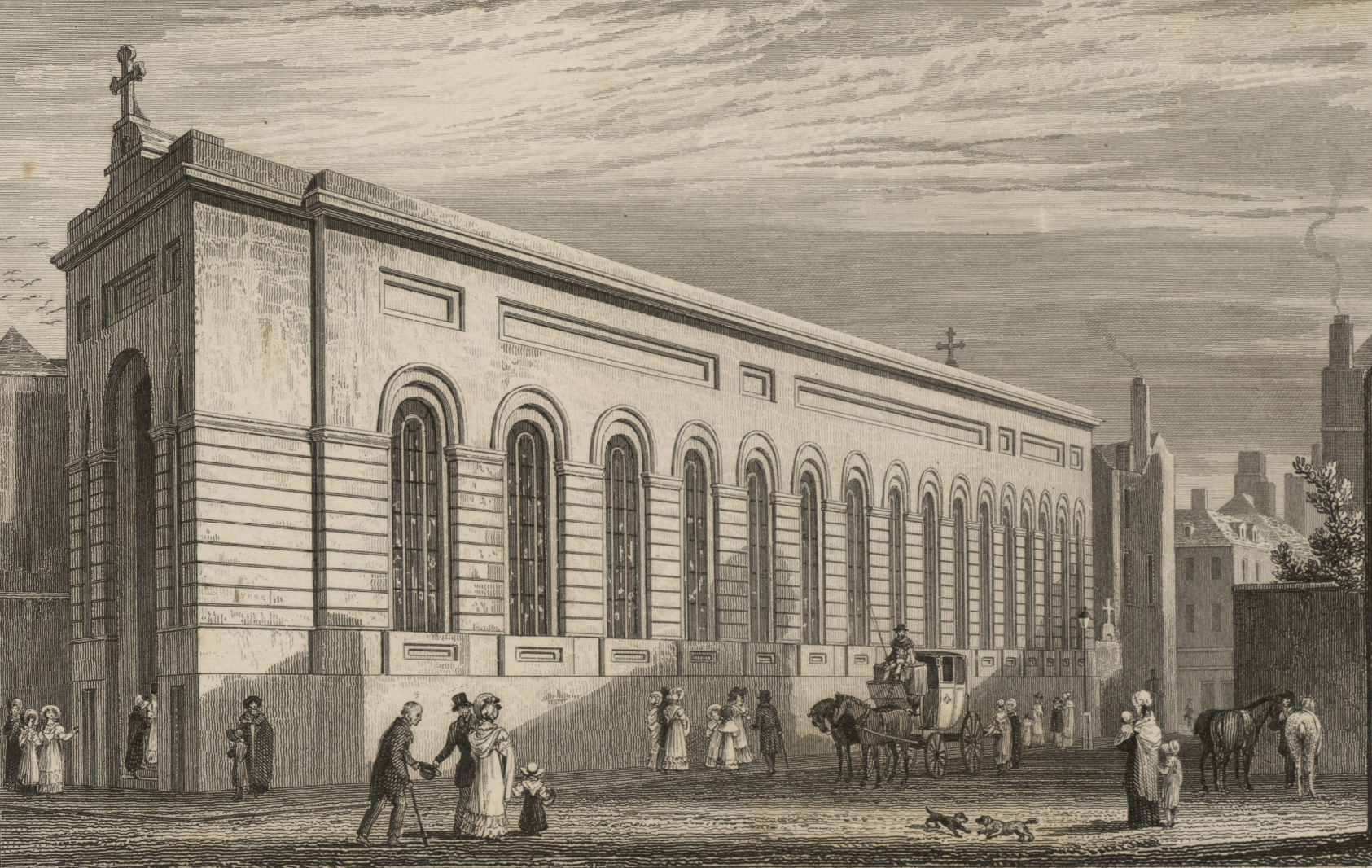
The Church of the Carmelite Friary, 1830

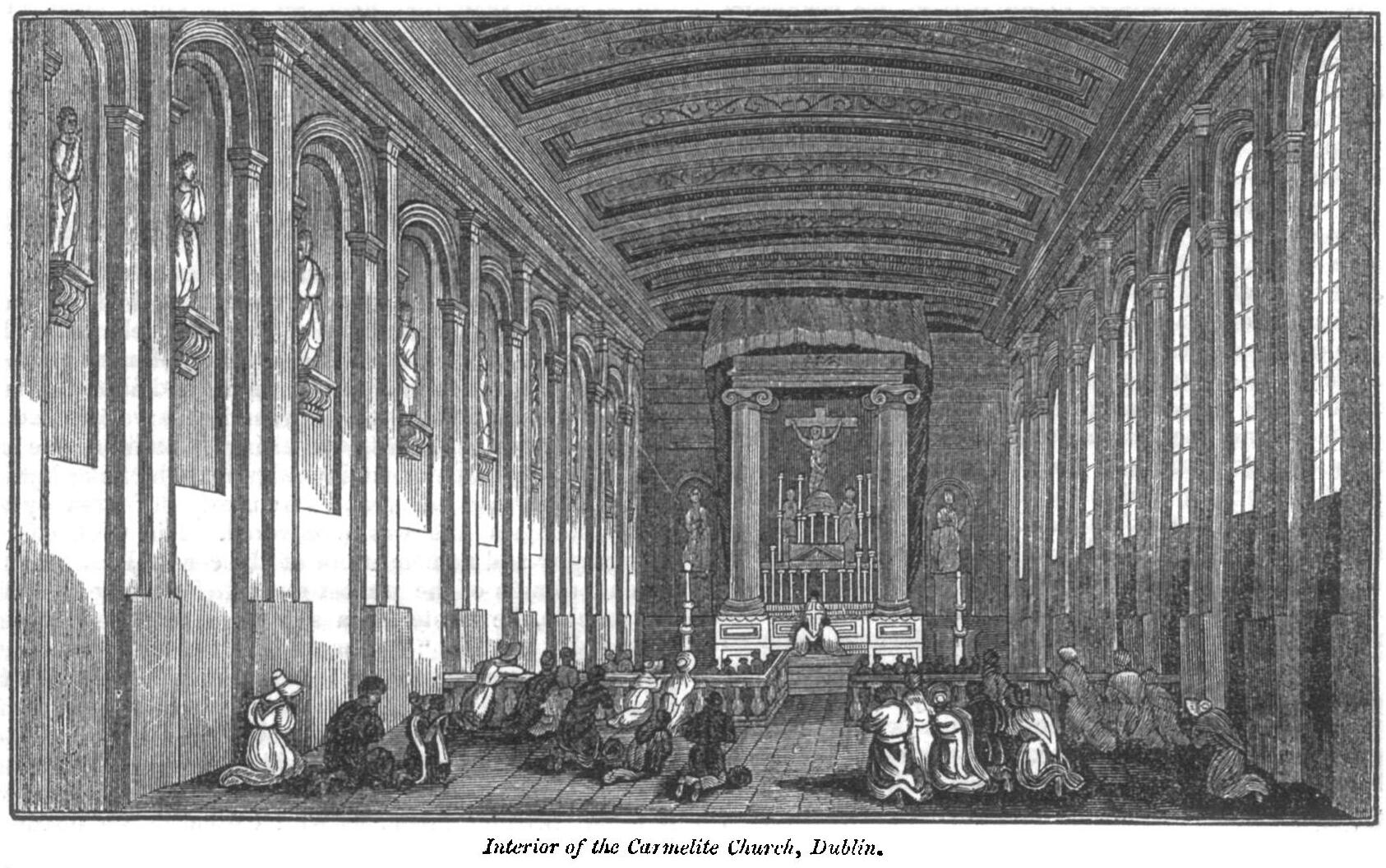
Interior 1832
