= Our Lady of Dublin =

Coordinates: 53°20′23.08″N 6°15′59.37″W

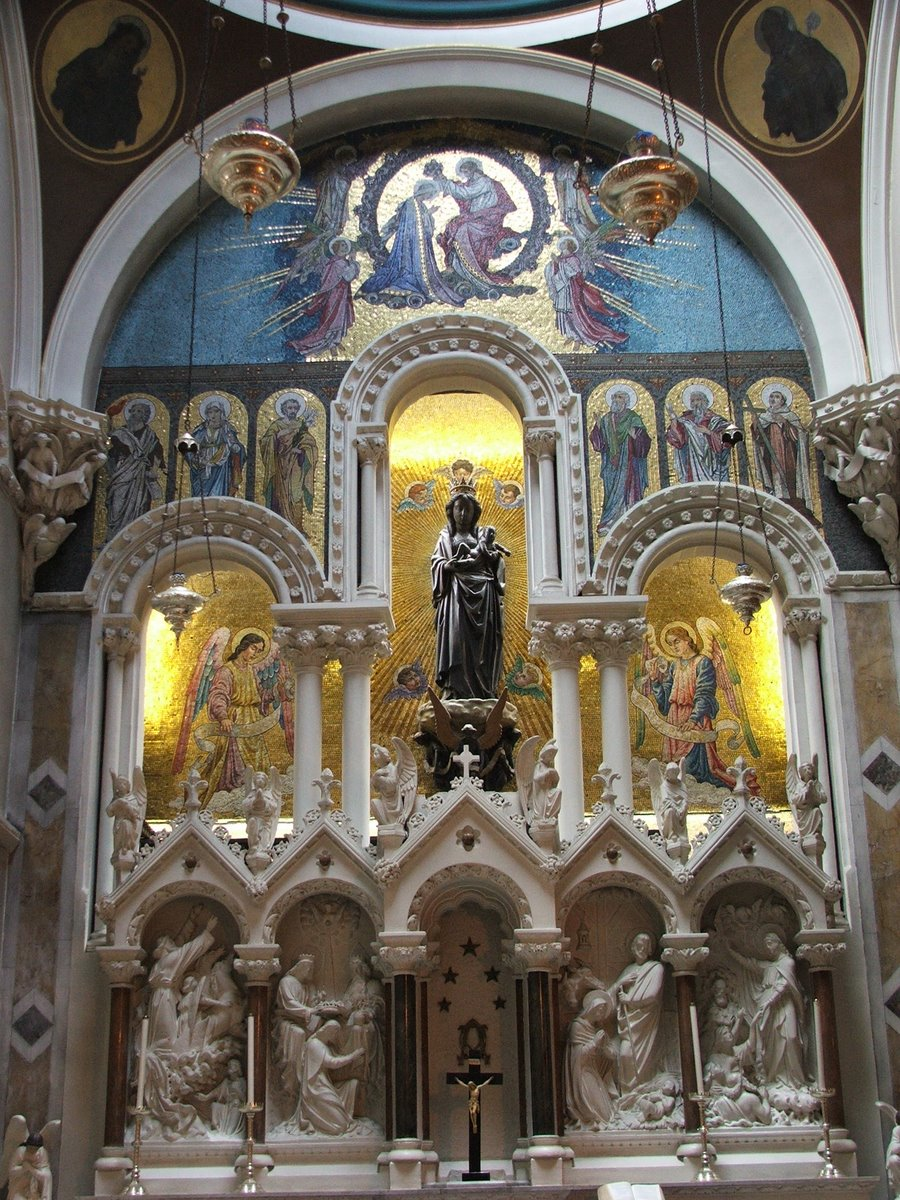
The Shrine of Our Lady of Dublin in Whitefriar Street Carmelite Church

Our Lady of Dublin is a statue of the Madonna and Child in Whitefriar Street Carmelite Church in Dublin, Ireland, that represents the Black Madonna of Ireland.

== History ==
Local legend with tenuous documentary support suggests that the statue originated in St. Mary's Abbey on Mary Street in Dublin which was dissolved as part of the Henrician reforms in 1539 (see: Dissolution of the Monasteries).

The first concrete historical mention dates from 1749 in a survey of the Catholic Chapels of Dublin, which refers to a statue in St. Mary's Lane Parochial Chapel. The chapel was torn down in 1816 to make way for a new school and no further mention of the statue is recorded until it was found by Father John Spratt, a member of the Carmelite order, in 1824.

The restored statue has been on display near the high altar of the church in a purpose built shrine since 1915.

The feast-day of Our Lady of Dublin is celebrated on 8 September.

== Description ==
Stylistically, the statue resembles early 16th-century wooden statuary and probably dates from that period. It is a life-size figure carved in oak.
