= Our Lady of Trapani procession (Tunis) =

Procession in Tunisia

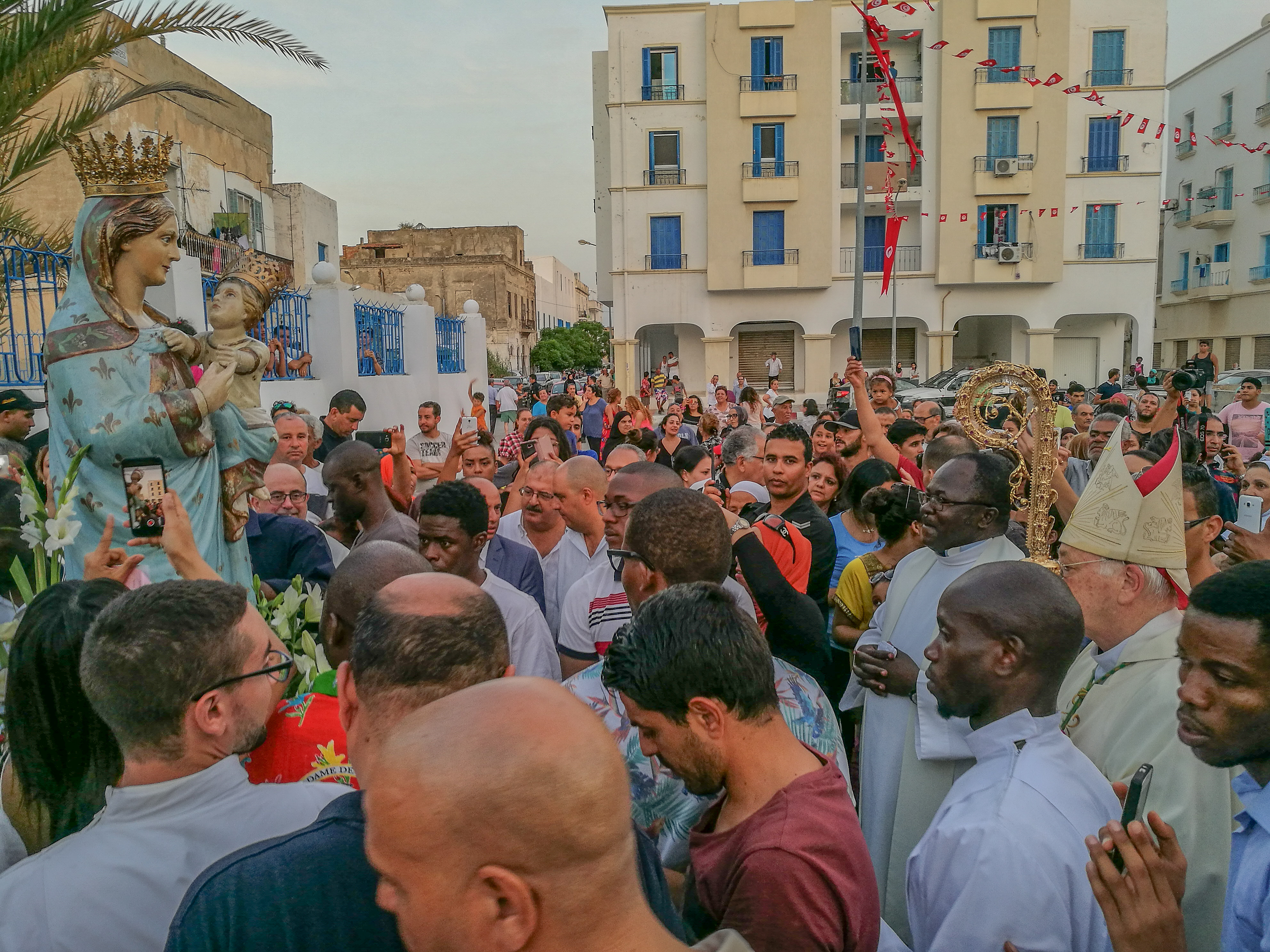
Our Lady of Trapani procession in Ahmed Bey Square in 2017

Our Lady of Trapani procession is a traditional festival that the Tunisian Christian community celebrates on the 15th of August of each year at Saint-Augustin and Saint-Fidèle's church in the city of La Goulette in Tunis.

== Historical background ==
According to Catholic and Orthodox belief, Virgin Mary, mother of Jesus, did not die but rather ascended to heaven during her lifetime or entered directly into the glory of God (what we would commonly translate as "ascent to heaven"). According to the story, the procession took place in Ephesus, in the house of the apostle John, which is also referred to as the House of the Virgin Mary.

All over the world, and for centuries, Christians have celebrated the procession annually on the 15th of August, the date of the consecration in Jerusalem of the first church dedicated to Mary in the fifth century, after the Council of Ephesus in 431.

== The celebration ==
=== History ===
In Italian popular culture, Our Lady of Trapani is the protector of the Italian city of Trapani in Sicily. She has been venerated by the Italian and Sicilian community of La Goulette since its arrival in the sixteenth century. In 1848, a church was built following a donation of land from Ahmed Bey. The building was initially dedicated to Saint Fidèle, patron of Fidèle Sutter, apostolic vicar of Tunis from 1844 to 1881. However, and considering the diversity of the local Christian community, the space got divided and each of the three chapels got dedicated to a Virgin Mary: Our Lady of Lourdes, Our Lady of Mont-Carmel and Our lady of Trapani for the French, Maltese, and Italians, respectively.

=== Activities ===
The celebration changed before and after Tunisia's independence. According to the archives of the Catholic Church, it reached its peak in 1909. It used to begin with the exit of the Madonna from the church on the shoulders of believers, who make her cross the streets of La Goulette, walking up to Tunis, all accompanied by a musical troupes. Some people used to follow this procession barefoot, to fulfill a wish. Then a fireworks show and a concert on Ahmed Bey square in La Goulette took place. According to popular culture, the prostitutes of the city came in the evening, accompanied by their pimps, to prostrate themselves at the feet of the cross, thus performing the so-called rite of the Madeleine.

The festivities take place simultaneously in Trapani in the same way, but what distinguishes the Tunisian version is the diversity of the participants who, in addition to Christians, also include Muslims. Some Muslims even attend mass inside the church.

The tradition of the procession was abandoned in the 1960s, due to the decrease in the number of Christians living in La Goulette, and until 2017, when the celebration resumed after Mass, but in a less visible way, in the interior courtyard of the church.

== The festival in popular culture ==
The procession of the Trapani Madonna was represented in the last scene of the Ferid Boughdir's film A Summer in La Goulette.

== Photos ==
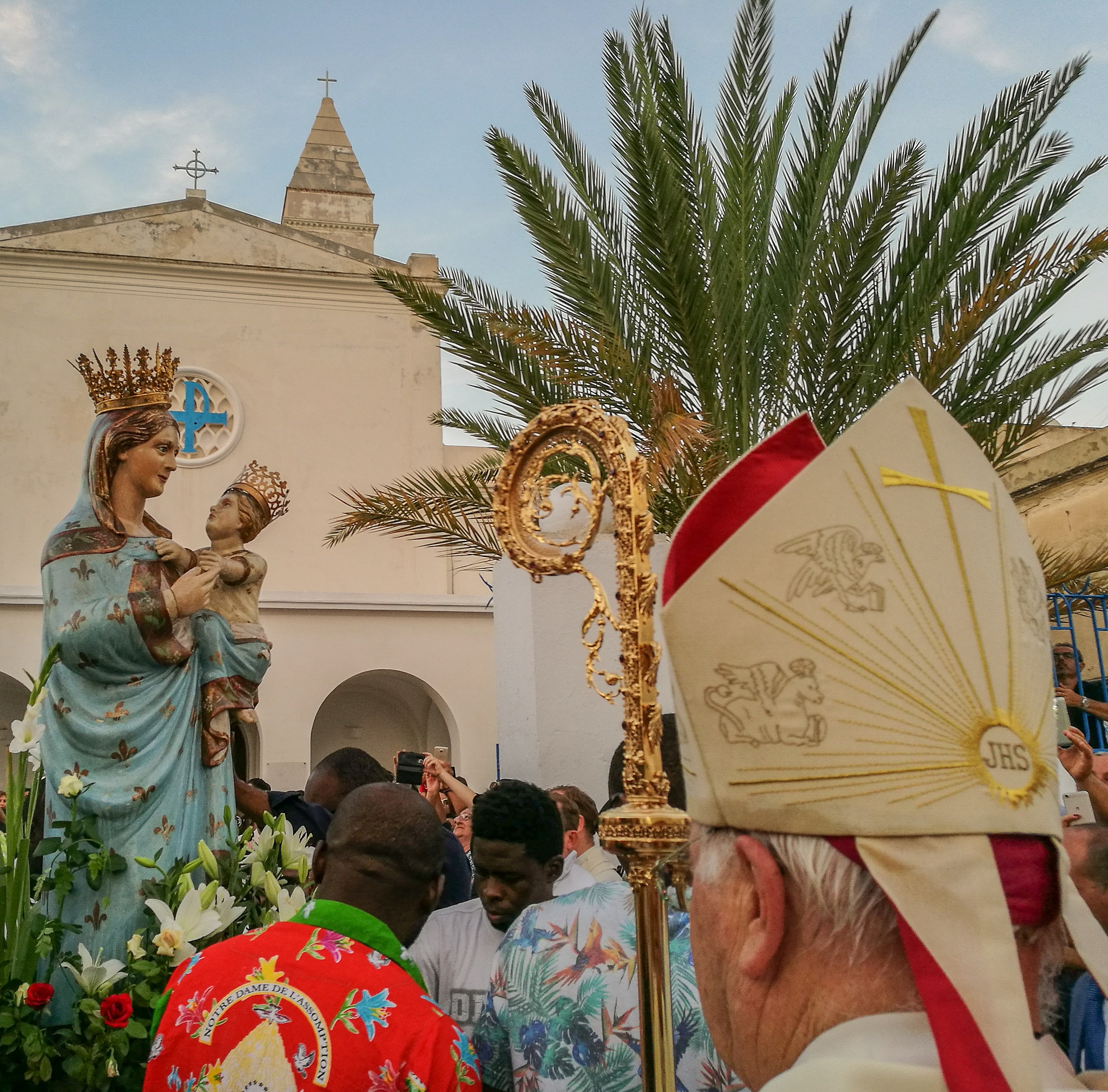
The Madonna leaving the church

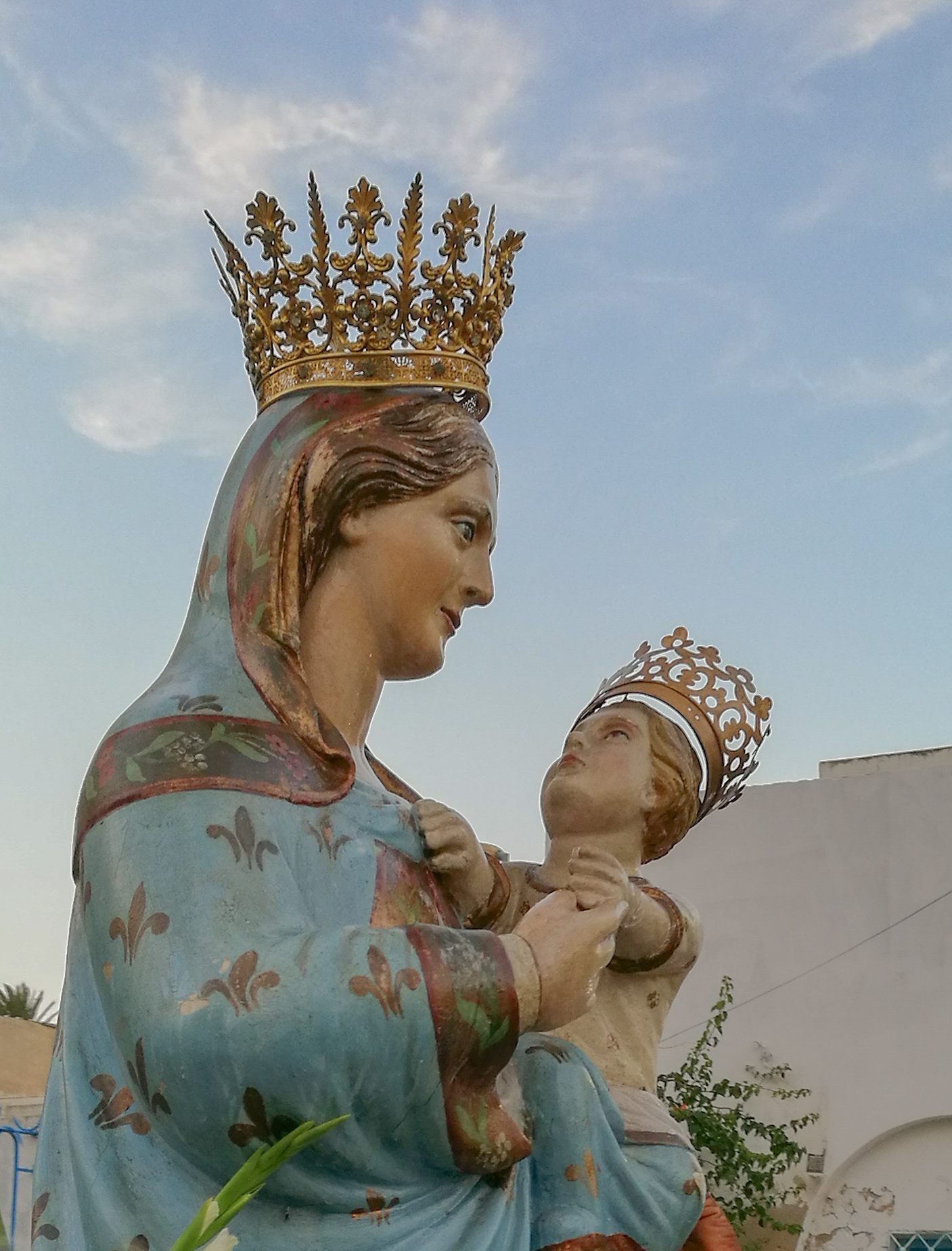
Our lady of Trapani statue

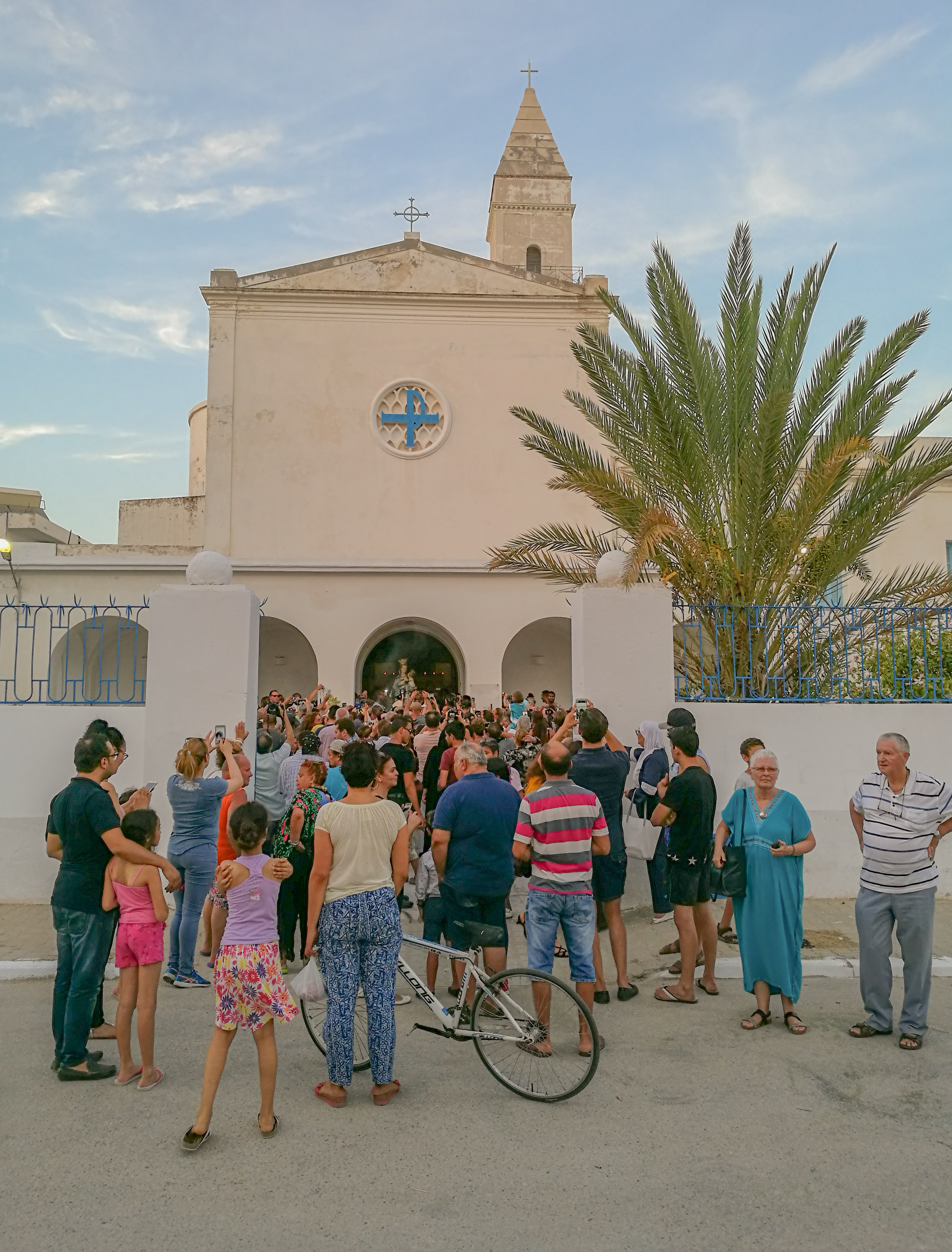
The celebration in 2017
