= Diocesan Museum of Palermo =

Museum in Palermo

The Diocesan Museum of Palermo (Italian - MUDIPA or Museo diocesano di Palermo) is a museum of religious art in Palermo on Sicily, housed in a number of rooms in the Palazzo Arcivescovile opposite Palermo Cathedral.

== History ==
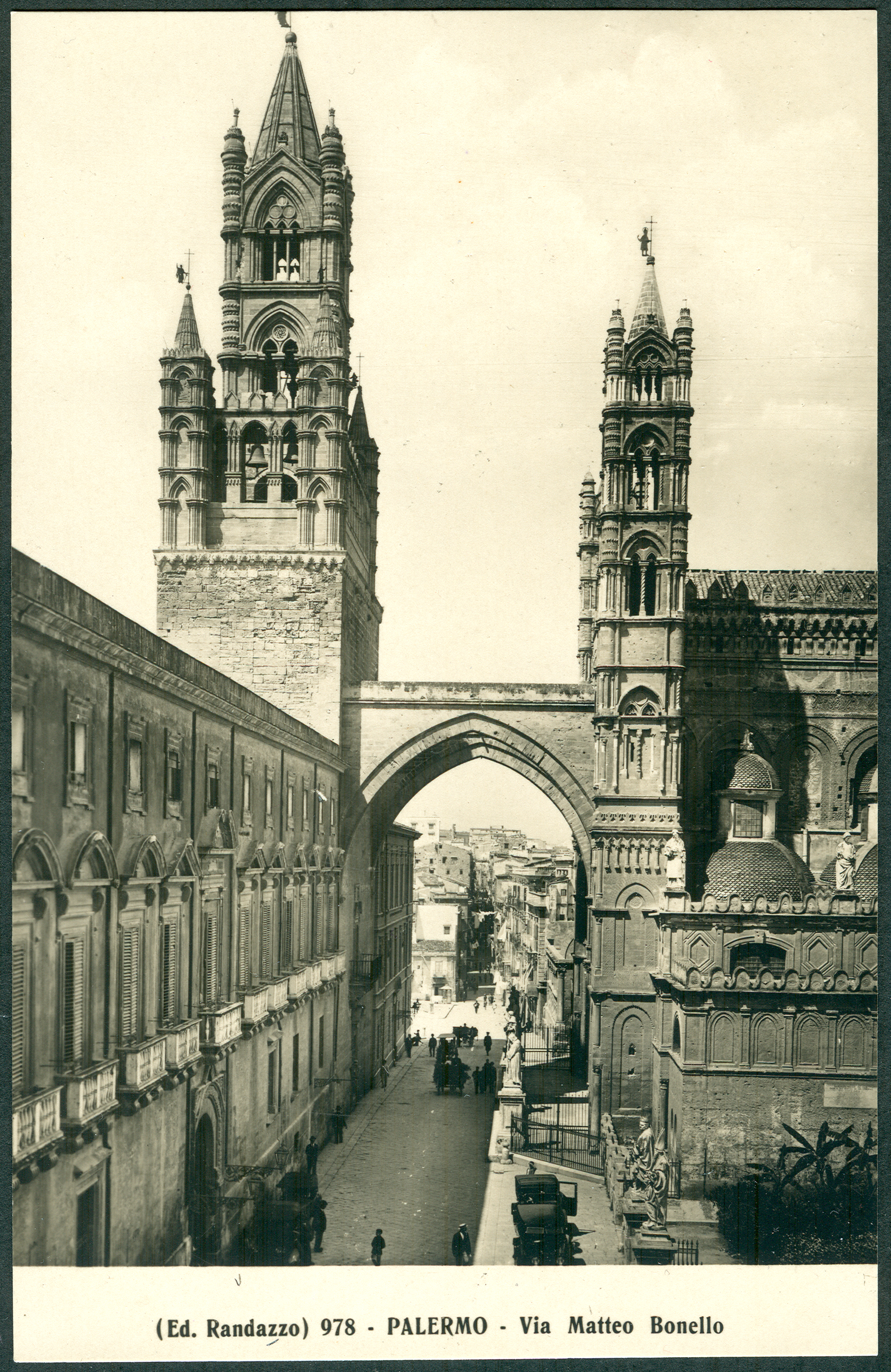
Postcard, randazzo N. 978, Gevaert

It was founded in 1927 by cardinal Alessandro Lualdi, Archbishop of Palermo (1904–1927).

== Layout ==
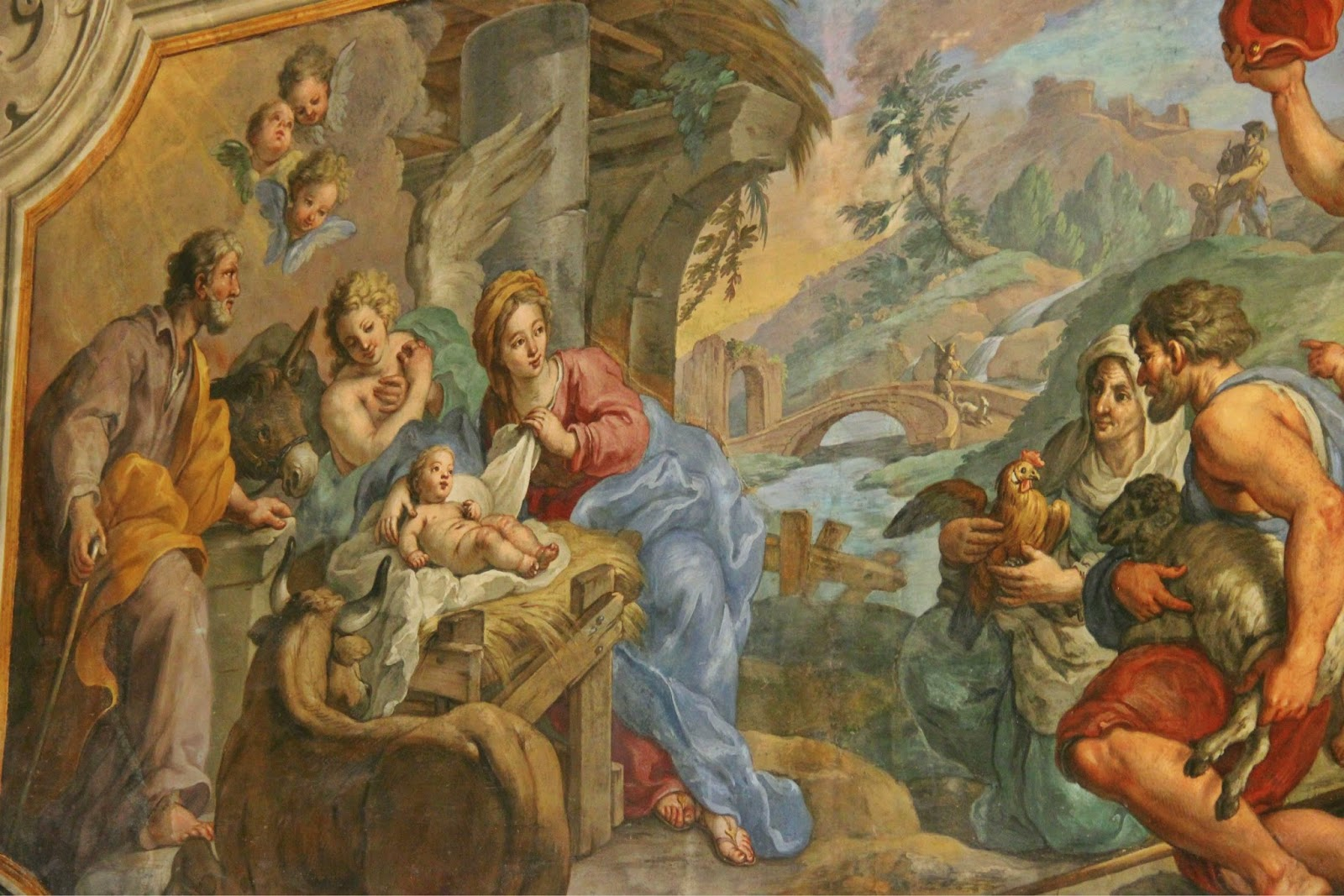
Nativity by Guglielmo Borremans

=== Room I ===
This houses the welcome desk as well as artworks from the Norman and Swabian eras.

=== Room II - Sala dei fondi oro ===
This contains works from the 14th and 15th centuries as well as imported 14th century Pisa works:

- 1171, Madonna of the Pearl, tempera on panel, anonymous, from Santa Maria del Cancelliere church
- 13th century, Madonna della Spersa, tempera on parchment mounted on panel, anonymous, from San Nicolò all'Albergheria church
- 1388, Roll of Dead Brothers, tempera on panel, Antonio Veneziano, commissioned by the Confraternita dei Disciplinanti, from San Nicolò lo Reale church
- 1419, Coronation of the Virgin Mary with St John the Baptist and St Nicholas of Bari, tempera on panel, Master of the Coronations, from San Nicolò lo Reale church.
- 15th century, Abraham and the Three Angels with a Commissioner, with an inscription "tres vidit et unum adoravit" (three see and one adores), tempera on panel, Master of the Coronations, from the basilica della Santissima Trinità del Cancelliere known as la Magione.
- 15th century, Madonna and Child, tempera on panel, anonymous Tuscan painter, from San Giovanni dei Napoletani church.

=== Room III - originally the Sala della trifora, now the Sala delle Croci' ===
As its current name suggests, it houses crosses.

=== Rooms IV–VI ===
Objects from excavations at the Archepiscopal Palace from the Archaic age, Byzantine period and medieval era.

=== Room VII ===
This houses 15th-century sculptures by artists such as Domenico Gagini, Pietro de Bonitate and Francesco Laurana. Those by Gagini are:

- Madonna, marble with a loggia
- Scenes from the Lives and Martyrdoms of Saint Christina and Saint Nympha, eight panel marble bas-relief, Domenico Gagini.
- XVI secolo, Saint Christina, marble half-bust.

=== Room VIII ===
This contains 16th-century sculptural fragments from Palermo Cathedral by Antonello Gagini and his workshop, removed during Ferdinando Fuga's rebuilding, along with a plaster reconstruction by Prof. Salvatore Rizzuti and his students at the Accademia di Belle Arti di Palermo and the sculptures from the Tribuna of Antonello Gagini in the cathedral.

- Marble candelabra, Antonello Gagini.
- Christ Falling and Crucifixion, marble bas-relief which inspired Raphael's Christ Falling on the Way to Calvary, Antonello Gagini.
- The Flight into Egypt, marble bas-relief, Antonello Gagini.
- 1544, Scenes from the Passion, marble bas-reliefs, Fazio and Vincenzo Gagini.
- The Recognition of the True Cross, marble bas-relief, Fazio Gagini.
- Saint Benedict, Saint Basil or Saint Bernard, marble statue, Fazio Gagini.
- 1535–1557, Saint Restituta of Africa, marble statue produced for the monastery church of Santa Chiara in Palermo, Antonello Gagini and Giacomo Gagini.

=== Room IX ===
Devoted to sculpture and decorative arts from the 17th and 18th centuries, it displays locally produced maiolica and several 16th-century mixed-marble fragments from the Cathedral and other Baroque churches in the city produced by local craftsmen. It also houses two 1728–1729 works by Giacomo Serpotta, Allegory of Faith and Allegory of Clemency, both in monochrome stucco.

=== Room X ===
Named after Mario Di Laurito, the room shows views of the city by him, particularly one of the city during the 1530 plague showing the view from the cathedral.

=== Room XI ===
This shows works from Mannerism to Caravaggism.

=== Room XII ===
This room displays works by Pietro Novelli and is named after him. These include an Annunciation in oil on canvas from Santa Maria delle Grazie di Montevergini church.

=== Room XIII ===
This displays 18th-century works.

== Selected works ==
- 1685–1686, Abraham and the Three Angels, oil on canvas, Pietro Aquila.
- 1622, Visitation, painting on panel, produced for the Congregazione di Santa Maria di Gesù, Pietro D'Asaro.
- 14th century, Virgin Mary with Saints, triptych, Jacopo di Michele
- 14th century, Saint Anne with Saints, triptych, Jacopo di Michele
- 15th century, Aedicula with the Virgin Mary Adoring the Christ Child, with God the Father Blessing, glazed terracotta relief, Andrea della Robbia, from San Nicolò al Borgo church

Restored works with temporary exhibitions:

- 15th century, Saint Barbara, painting on panel, originally from the cathedral and housed in the 'Antialcova (temporary exhibition), Cristofaro Faffeo.
- 1580–1581, Madonna of the Rosary with Saints, painting on panel from San Giacomo dei Militari church and housed in the Sala Torre (temporary exhibition space), Simone de Wobreck.
- 17th century, Saint Cecilia, painting on canvas, from the former Istituto del Sacro Cuore, then the villa Pignatelli Aragona Cortes at Olivuzza, now housed in the Sala Rossa of the bishops' rooms or in the Sala Novelli, attributed to Andrea Carreca.
- 17th century, Portrait of Monsignor Ferdinando Bazan y Manriquez, Archbishop of Palermo, oil on canvas, housed in the Sala Verde (temporary exhibitions)

== Bibliography (in Italian) ==
- F. Pottino, Il Museo Diocesano di Palermo, (guida sintetica del museo), Stabilimento tipo-litografico I.R.E.S., Palermo 1969.
- Maria Concetta Di Natale, Arti Minori nel Museo Diocesano di Palermo, Quaderni dell'Archivio Fotografico delle Arti Minori in Sicilia, 3, Palermo, 1986.
- Capolavori d'arte del Museo Diocesano. Ex sacris imaginibus magnum fructum, a cura di Maria Concetta Di Natale, Edizioni O.DI.PA., Palermo, 1998.
- Arti decorative nel Museo Diocesano. Dalla città al museo dal museo alla città, a cura di Maria Concetta Di Natale, Edizioni O.DI.PA., Palermo, 1999.
- Maria Concetta di Natale (2006). Il Museo Diocesano di Palermo (PDF) (in Italian). Vol. Unico. Palermo: Flaccovio editore. ISBN 88-7804-295-1.
- P. Palazzotto, Il Fondo Pottino-Collura. Per una storia delle collezioni del Museo Diocesano di Palermo, in Storia & Arte nella scrittura. L'Archivio Storico Diocesano di Palermo a 10 anni dalla riapertura al pubblico (1997-2007), Atti del Convegno Internazionale di Studi (Palermo 9-10 novembre 2007) a cura di G. Travagliato, Edizioni Associazione Centro Studi Aurora Onlus, Santa Flavia (Palermo) 2008, ISBN 978-88-95823-04-1, pp. 247–284.
- P. Palazzotto, Le attività, in Il Museo Diocesano di Palermo, in Sentire l'Arte. Un'esperienza interculturale nella didattica museale, catalogo della mostra (Palermo, Palazzo Arcivescovile 23 maggio - 2 giugno 2008, Novi Sad, Galleria di Matica Srpska, 13 giugno - 21 giugno 2008), Novi Sad, Offset Print, 2008, ISBN 978-86-83603-25-1, pp. 38–41.
- P. Palazzotto, Verso il nuovo Museo Diocesano di Palermo: il progetto museologico della “Galleria Arcivescovile, in Museo Diocesano di Palermo. Ambienti e mostre a cantiere aperto, catalogo della mostra (Palermo 13 luglio – 30 settembre 2011), Assessorato regionale dei Beni Culturali e dell'Identità Siciliana, Palermo, 2011, pp. 21–25.
- Italiano, Touring Club (1989). "Guida d'Italia" - "Sicilia" (in Italian). Touring Editore. ISBN 9788836503506 – via Touring Club Italiano.
- Gioacchino di Marzo; Conte Antonio Cavagna Sangiuliani di Gualdana Lazelada di Bereguardo (1880). Stamperia del Giornale di Sicilia (ed.). I Gagini e la scultura in Sicilia nei secoli XV e XVI; memorie storiche e documenti (in Italian). Vol. I e II. Palermo.
