= Santa Lucia, Rieti =

Catholic church in Rieti, Italy

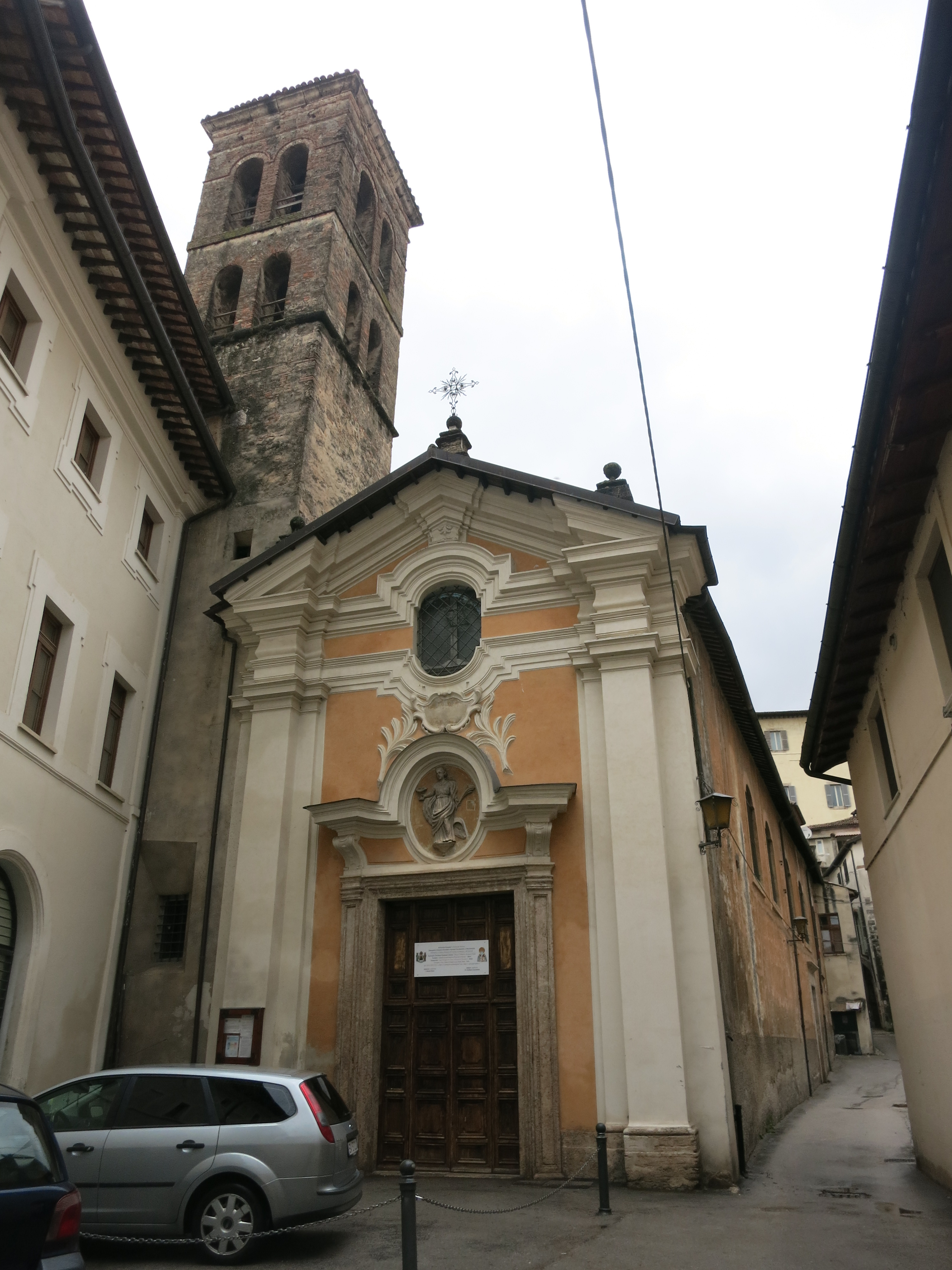
Church and bell-tower

Santa Lucia is a Baroque-style, former-Roman Catholic church and the adjacent convent is located on Vicolo Santa Lucia #8 in the medieval center of the city of Rieti, region of Lazio, Italy. The church now mainly celebrates Roman Orthodox rites. The convent in 2020 houses the archaeologic collections of the Museo Civici of Rieti.

== History ==
A church and female monastery was begun in 1237 and completed by 1252 at a rural site known as Voto dei Santi under the guidance of Angelo Tancredi, one of the twelve followers of St Francis. It is claimed that in 1253, Tancredi then relayed this foundation to St Clare, who sent her sister and former duenna, Beatrice and Pacifica respectively, to the monastery. This would be one of the first Clarissan convents outside of Assisi.

Returning from the Council of Trent, Cardinal Marcantonio Amulio set to reduce the number of cloistered nuns in rural sites, forced the move on 24 February 1566 of these nuns to the present urban site, a convent and church formerly known as San Sebastiano, which was rededicated to Santa Lucia. San Sebastiano had belonged since 1348 to the Confraternity of the Misericordia. The move to this new home was a solemn public ceremony with the nuns, flanked by women, in a procession including the Cardinal, local priests, and trumpets and drums. By the evening, the monastery was to embrace a cloistered existence. Along with the nuns traveled a bell dated 1292 and dedicated to Philippa Mareri. By 1270, 13 nuns were housed in the monastery. Here they remained until 1886, when the convent was suppressed and the property confiscated. The site remained abandoned for years, but restored and reconsecrated by 1924 by the Sopraintendente dei Monumenti dell'Umbria.

Once the convent was suppressed, the buildings were used as schools until the 1960s. In 2001, the commune moved the Archaeologic collections to the first floor of the monastery.

== Decoration ==
The facade was completed in 1729.

The interior of the church was refurbished starting in 1610, and leading a reconsecration in 1727. The main altar (1688) is decorated with polychrome marble was designed by Nazario Ferrari, and displays a stucco Glory of God the Father, Faith and Charity (1688) by Antonio Maria Ravezzani. The main altarpiece is a 17th-century canvas depicting the Ascension attributed to Cesare Tuppi. Two statues in niches depict St Francis and St Clare. Because Gianlorenzo Bernini had three granddaughters in the monastery, some attribute the statues to him. The left lateral altar has a canvas depicting a Virgin and St Anne before a St Lawrence in prayer (1655) attributed to Ciro Ferri. The ceiling has decorated panels patronized by the Vecchierelli family. In 2020, the church is under restoration but consecrated for worship.
