= San Francesco d'Assisi, Alcamo =

Church in Sicily, Italy

Church of Saint Francis of Assisi
- Chiesa di San Francesco d'Assisi
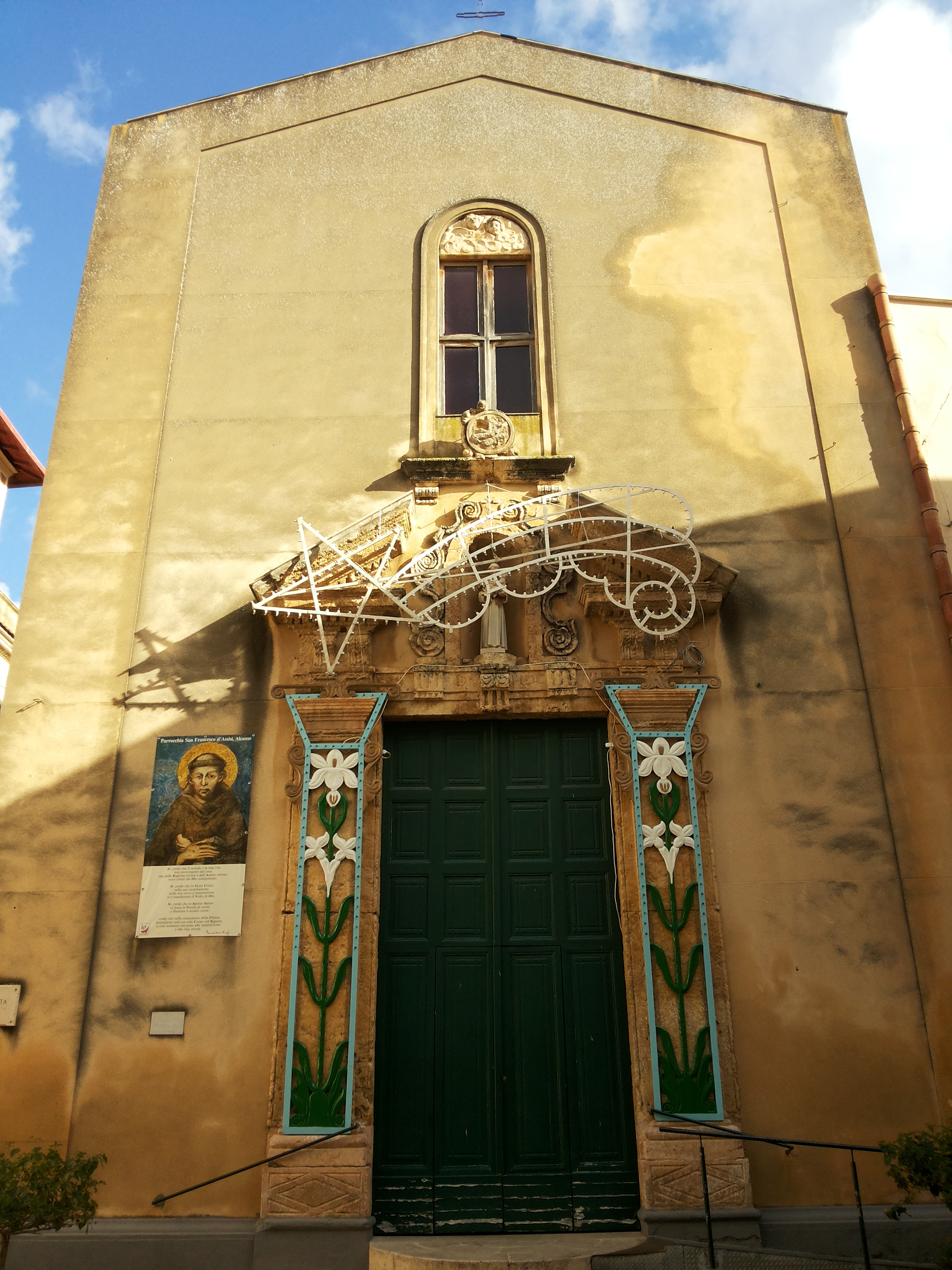
- The façade of the church of Saint Francis of Assisi

Religion
- Affiliation: Franciscan
- Province: province of Trapani
- Region: Sicily
- Rite: Catholic

Location
- Location: Alcamo, Trapani, Italy
- State: Italy
- Interactive map of Church of Saint Francis of Assisi
- Territory: Alcamo
- Coordinates: 37°58′52″N 12°58′07″E

Architecture
- Groundbreaking: 1348

Website
- www.fratiminoriconventualisicilia.it/conventi/alcamo.htm

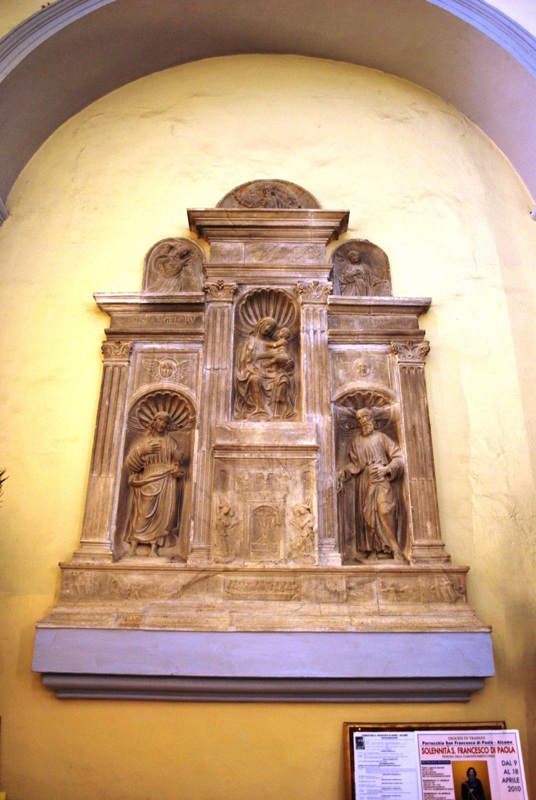
The marble altarpiece of Madonna with Child.

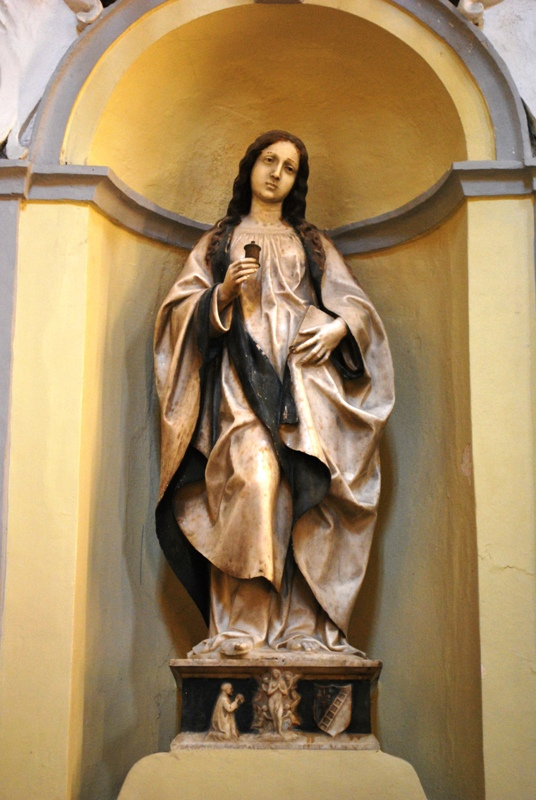
The Maddalena's statue.

San Francesco d'Assisi ("Saint Francis of Assisi") is a 16th-century-style church dedicated to Saint Francis of Assisi, located in Alcamo, province of Trapani, Sicily, southern Italy.

== History ==
Though according to the historiographic tradition the church had been built between the years 1224 and 1226 by the Blessed Angelo Tancredi of Rieti, one of Saint Francis' fellows, the document of the church's acquisition by the Sicilian province, sealed by Pope Clement VI, dates back to 1348.

Between 1379 and 1380 it was reconstructed.

Since the 16th century, Saint Francis' church gave the name to one of the oldest quarters in Alcamo, together with the other three of San Giacomo de Spada, San Calogero and Maggiore Chiesa.

The church was rebuilt for the second time between 1608 and 1648: in this period it was first demolished and later rebuilt, then it was enlarged and embellished in 1716. After the 1968 Belice earthquake, in order to repair the damages suffered by the Church and the convent, there was another restoration which lasted from 1975 to 1976.

== The Conventual Franciscans ==
The Conventual Franciscans were in Alcamo from 1348 to 1866 and came back in 1962. Thanks to a decree of Pope Innocent III dated 1250, they called Conventual the Franciscan Fathers who observed a less rigid Rule of Saint Francis and wore a brown sack and shoes instead of sandals. The friary, which in 1612 expanded to the part of Corso 6 Aprile adjoining the Church and north of it, was rebuilt where it is placed now.

In 1866 it was confiscated by the municipality and became the residence of the Boarding School for the Young Artisans in 1871, then the Carabinieri’s Post and in 1946–47 the junior school "Nino Navarra"; later these premises were used by a Vocational School of Agriculture, and today they host a unit of the primary school "Luigi Pirandello". When the Franciscan Fathers came back in 1962 they were assigned the Church, which became a Parish in 1969, and some rooms.

== Description ==
The church is with a nave with a barrel vault and a side chapel dedicated to the Immaculate Conception. The adjoining bell tower and the main portal are the only parts which have remained unaltered as to the original project. Next to the Church there are the Franciscan cloister and the Immacolata Brotherhood's Oratory, founded in 1596 and formed by "respectful people", "teachers and priests".

== Works ==
Works in the church include:

- St Francis of Assisi asking for the Indulgence of Porziuncola (1677) main altarpiece by Andrea Carrera.
- First left altar: marble ancona called "Madonna with the Child", probable work of Giacomo Gagini (1568)
- Second left altar: Purity, a wooden statue by an unknown author
- Third left altar: saint Francis of Assisi, wooden statue made by Giuseppe Ospedale in 1933
- Fourth left altar: Saint Mark, a white marble statue by Antonello Gagini (1520).
- Fifth left altar: the wooden Crucifix of the "Very Precious Blood" (by an unknown 17th century author) with an oval painting below it and representing Our Lady of Sorrows, assigned to Giuseppe Renda from Alcamo.
- On the right side of the apse: a 17th-century painting with the Virgin of Mercy talking to a cardinal with a group of black people around him
- First right altar (after the Chapel of the Immaculate Conception): a bronze statue of Saint Maximilian Kolbe
- Second right altar: St Anthony of Padua, a wooden statue by an unknown author
- Third right altar: a painting dedicated to Madonna della Salute, made by Francesco Alesi, a priest, in 1942
- Fourth right altar: a marble statue of Mary Magdalen carved by Antonello Gagini in 1520; below it there is the coat of arms of the Scalisi family, which got it to be realized. At first it was placed inside a chapel on the right, entering the church, where they built the chapel of the Immaculate, then it was moved.

Besides, high on the nave's walls, there are four paintings: two of them represent saint Francis and two saint Clara and saint Bonaventura. Inside the friary there are two oval paintings with Ecce Homo and Our Lady of Sorrows, probable work of the 18th century.

In the Immacolata's chapel there is a painting of the Immaculate, made by Giuseppe Carrera in 1610 and restored in 1980. In the same chapel until 1884 there were 34 pictures of saints, which had been added in 1613 thanks to the Confraternity of Immacolata Concezione's brothers, who had their names written on them. In a niche of the chapel there is also the wooden statue of Immaculate Conception, carved in 1695 by Ignazio Ingrassia, a wood-carver from Trapani.

The chapel is also home to four paintings realized by Rosalino la Mattina, representing the most important moments of the Virgin's Conception and a marble altar made in 1951 by Giovan Battista Di Girolamo from Castellammare del Golfo.

Inside the Confraternity's oratory there is a painting of Saint Benedict Joseph Labre realized in 1888 by Nicolò Pizzitola, a painter from Alcamo.

== See also ==
- Alcamo
- Compagnia dell'Immacolata Concezione
- Order of Friars Minor
- Order of Friars Minor Conventual

== Sources ==
- Calia, Roberto; Craparo, Enzo; Baldassano Cataldo, Erina (1991). La Bella Alcamo (in Italian). Alcamo: Edizioni Blu Imaging & Adv.
- Calia, Roberto; Di Natale, Maria Concetta; Vitella, Maurizio (2004). Giuseppe Renda (1772–1805). Alcamo: Centro Studi Don Rizzo.
- Cataldo, Carlo (2001). La conchiglia di S. Giacomo p.234. Alcamo: Edizioni Campo.
- De Blasi, Ignazio (1984). Discorso storico della opulenta città di Alcamo, situata a pie' del monte Bonifato e dell'antichissima città di Longarico (in Italian).
- Regina, Vincenzo (1995). Una compagnia quattro volte centenaria e l'Immacolata nel culto e nell'iconografia alcamese (in Italian). Cassa Rurale ed Artigiana di Alcamo "Don Rizzo".
- Rotolo, F. (1977). La chiesa di S. Francesco d'Assisi in Alcamo (in Italian). Palermo.
