= Gaspare Testone =

Italian painter and architect

Gaspare Testone (8 May 1704 – 1801) was an Italian painter and architect, active in Sicily. He painted sacred subjects, primarily in the Baroque style

== Biography ==
Testone was born to the daughter of the painter Michele Blasco in Sciacca. He began learning under Francesco Aversa, a pupil of Blasco. He then moved to train in Palermo. He painted a Death of St Joseph, and a St Benedict destroy the Idols and chases the Demons from Monte Cassino for Santa Maria dell'Itria. he also painted still lifes, genre scenes, and portraits. He also painted a Holy Family, a St Scolastica, and the Martyrdom of St Eufemia. He painted a San Biagio, a Presentation of the Virgin at the Temple, an Annunciation, and a Massacre of the Innocents. For the church of Santa Margherita, he painted an Adoration of the Magi and a Nativity (design by Sebastiano Conca). Also in Sciacca, he painted a St. Cataldo and painted for the Santuario di San Calogero a canvas depicting St Zosimo Administers the Eucharist to St Maria Egiziaca.
