= Vito Carrera =

Italian painter

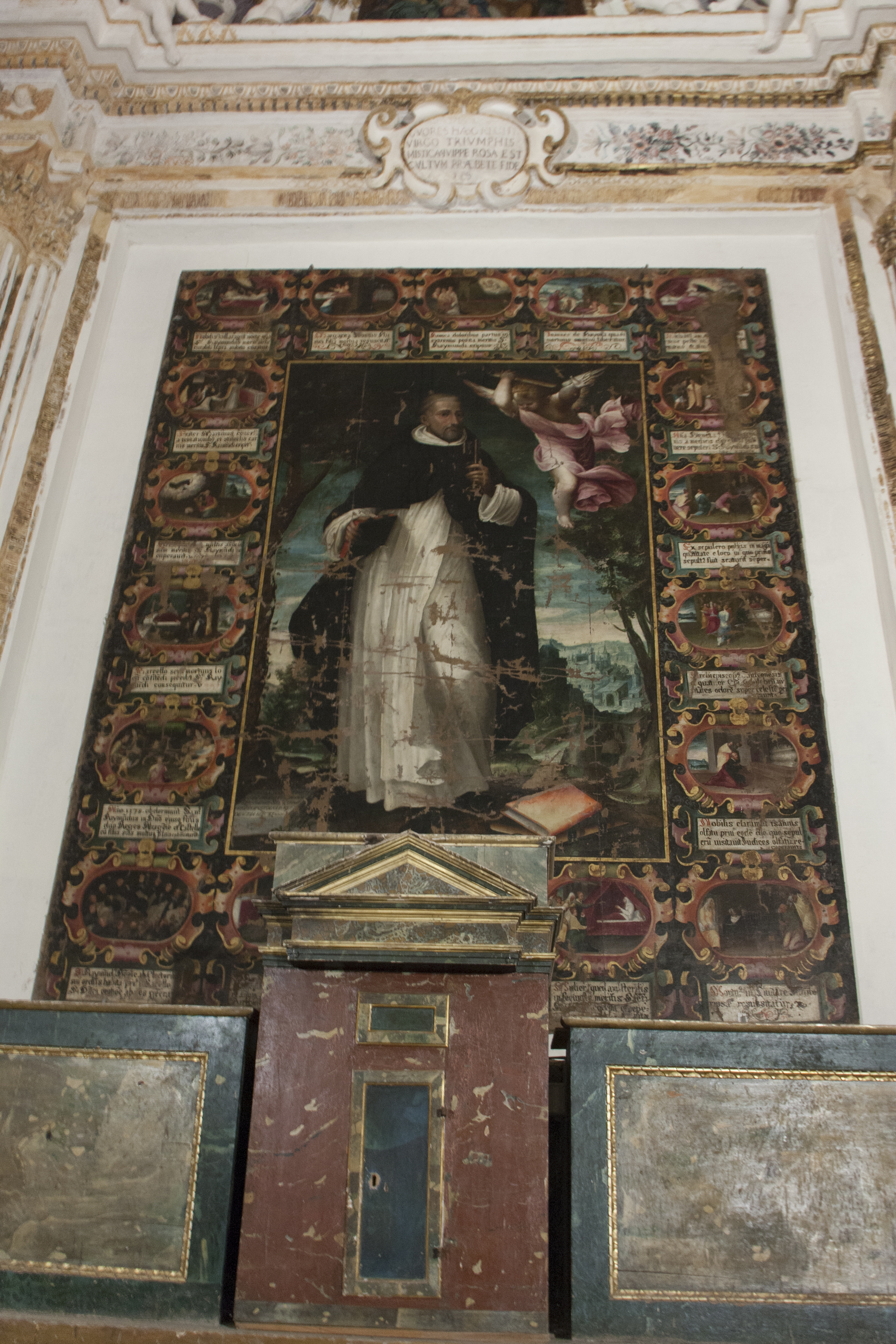

Vito Carrera (born in Trapani, active 1603 – died Palermo, 1623) was an Italian painter of the Baroque period, active mainly in Palermo. Also known as il Trapanese, since he was born in Trapani. Among his pupils were Pietro Novelli and Andrea Carreca. In Trapani, he painted for the church of the Dominicani, and the organ doors for the church of Santa Maria di Gesu.
