= Andrea Carrera =

Italian painter (1590–1677)

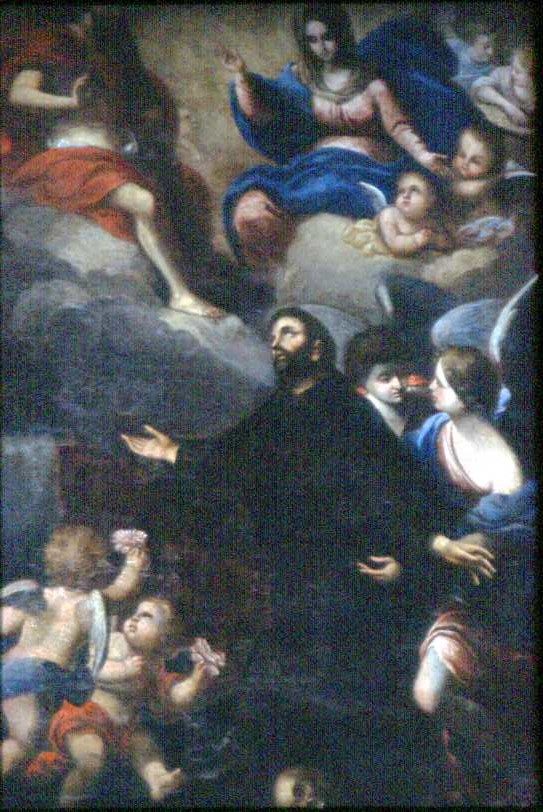
San Francis Seeking the Porzuncola Indulgence (around 1677)

Andrea Carrera or Carreca (1590 – 3 February 1677) was an Italian Baroque painter mainly active in Sicily. He was born in Trapani and died in Palermo.

== Life ==
He was the son of Andrea and Mattia di Vincenzo, making him nephew to the painters Vito and Giuseppe Carrera;. He studied literature and philosophy in Trapani before studying civil and canon law in Catania. He studied under his uncle Vito and also attended the studios of Pietro Novelli in Palermo and Anthony van Dyck in Rome. His panel paintings also show clear influence from Caravaggio, who was working in Palermo in 1609, whilst his art as a whole also shows borrowings from Venetian painting and Novelli.

The majority of his works are in Trapani, the rest of western Sicily and Palermo – some from demolished churches are in the Museo Pepoli, such as Jacob's Dream, Madonna and Child with St Anthony and Angels, Madonna of the Rosary and St Albert the Carmelite. In Trapani, the collegiata di San Pietro Apostolo and churches of Santa Maria del Soccorso (the "Badia Nuova") and San Domenico (Martyrdom of St Peter) house paintings by him. In 1672 he produced frescoes for a chapel in Palermo Cathedral, a chapel of the Casa Professa and the chancel of San Giuseppe dei Teatini church in collaboration with Calandricci. In 1675 he also produced paintings for the Saint Gaetano chapel in Mazara del Vallo Cathedral. He is buried in San Giuseppe dei Teatini in Palermo.

== Works ==
=== Province of Agrigento ===
- Holy Family, San Giuseppe church in Casteltermini.

=== Province of Trapani ===
- Saint Francis of Paola (1642) painting on panel, Badia Nuova, Alcamo.
- Madonna of the Rosary (1658) canvas, Santi Cosma e Damiano church, Alcamo.
- Madonna with Angels (1669) canvas, Santi Cosma e Damiano church
- St Francis Seeking the Porziuncola Indulgence (circa 1677) San Francesco d'Assisi church, Alcamo.
- 1664, Saint Anne, painting on canvas, Sanctuary of Sant'Anna, Erice.
- Stoning of Saint Stephen (1677) canvas, San Cataldo church, Erice
- San Tommaso d'Aquino (1667) canvas, recorded in the Dominican monastery of San Michele church, Erice.
- Saints Martha and Mary Magdalene, painting on canvas, from Santissimo Salvatore church, now in the Museo civico «Antonino Cordici», Erice.
- St Roch and Saint Philip and Saint James, paintings on canvas, San Biagio church, Salemi.
- Holy Trinity with the Virgin Mary and Madonna della Misericordia (1654) paintings on canvas, Sanctuary of Nostra Signora della Misericordia, Valderice.
- Saint George and the Dragon (1634) canvas, Trapani Cathedral, Trapani.
- Cycle of apse ceiling frescoes, recorded in Trapani Cathedral
- Nazarenus Hugging the Cross, painting on canvas, basilica-santuario di Maria Santissima Annunziata, Trapani.
- Ecstacy of Saint Nicolò da Tolentino, painting on canvas Santa Maria dell'Itria church, Trapani.
- Saint Peter Martyr, painting on canvas, San Domenico church.
- Ecstacy of Saint Catherine, painting, Badìa Nuova church, Trapani.
- Saint Thomas Aquinas, painting, Badìa Nuova church.
- Transfiguration, Saint Paul and Saint Peter Calling Saint Andrew, San Pietro church, Trapani.
- Madonna of the Rosary with Saints Dominic and Catherine, Episcopio, Trapani
- Guardian Angel, painting on canvas, attributed to him, recorded in the Oratorio dell'Angelo Custode, now in the Museo regionale Agostino Pepoli, Trapani
- Saint John the Evangelist, painting on canvas, recorded in San Giovanni Battista church, Trapani

=== Province of Palermo ===
- circa 1670, Saint Rosalia, painting on panel, Saint Rosalia Chapel, San Domenico church, Palermo.
- Saint Cecilia, attributed to him, painting on canvas, from the former Istituto del Sacro Cuore, then the villa Pignatelli Aragona Cortes all'Olivuzza, now in the Sala Rossa of the bishops' rooms or the Sala Novelli in the Diocesan Museum of Palermo
- Saint Teresa, recorded in the sacristy of Santa Teresa alla Kalsa church, Palermo
- Virgin Mary and Saint Andrea Avellino, Santa Maria della Catena church.
- Saint Onufrius Kneeling, fresco, vault of the antioratorio in Sant'Onofrio church, Palermo
- 17th century, fresco cycle on the apse of San Giuseppe dei Teatini, Palermo, in collaboration with Giacinto Calandricci
- 1660, Annunciation, painting on panel, Duomo di Santa Maria Assunta, Sclafani Bagni

== Destroyed or doubtful works ==
- 1644, Saint Carlo Borromeo, commissioned by cardinal Vincenzo Artale for Palermo Cathedral, now lost, though a canvas of a similar subject is still in the minor seminary in Baida.
- 1672, Fresco Cycle, recorded in the Cappella del Sacramento at Palermo Cathedral, destroyed by 18th century restorations

== Gallery ==
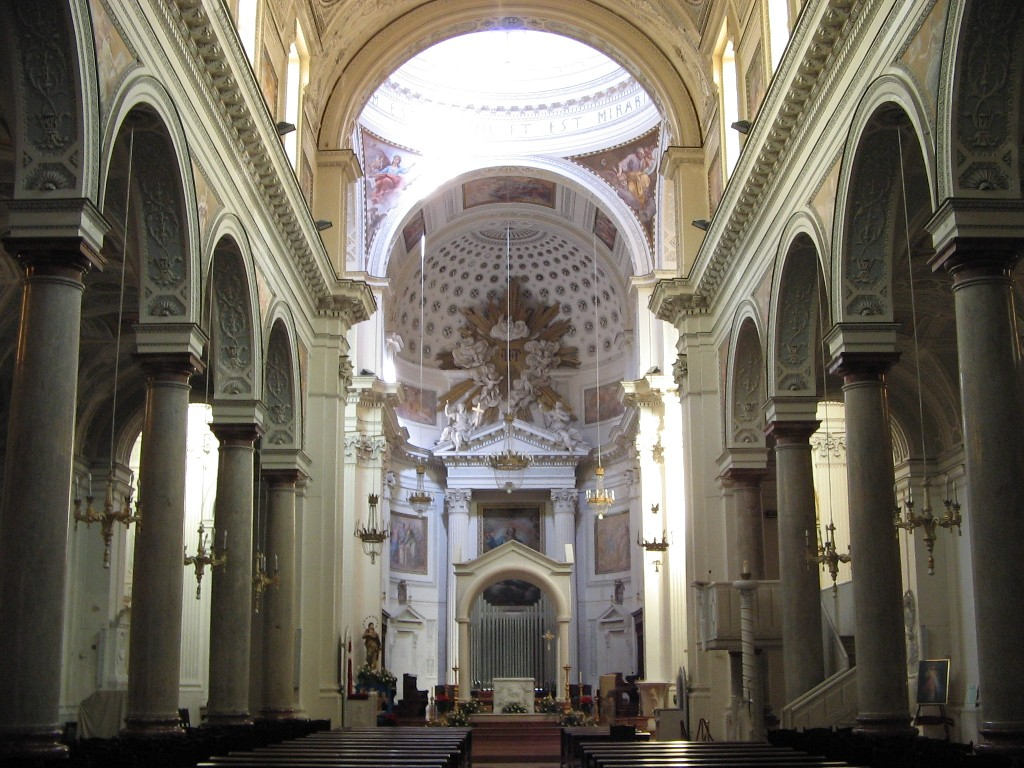
Apse of Trapani Cathedral

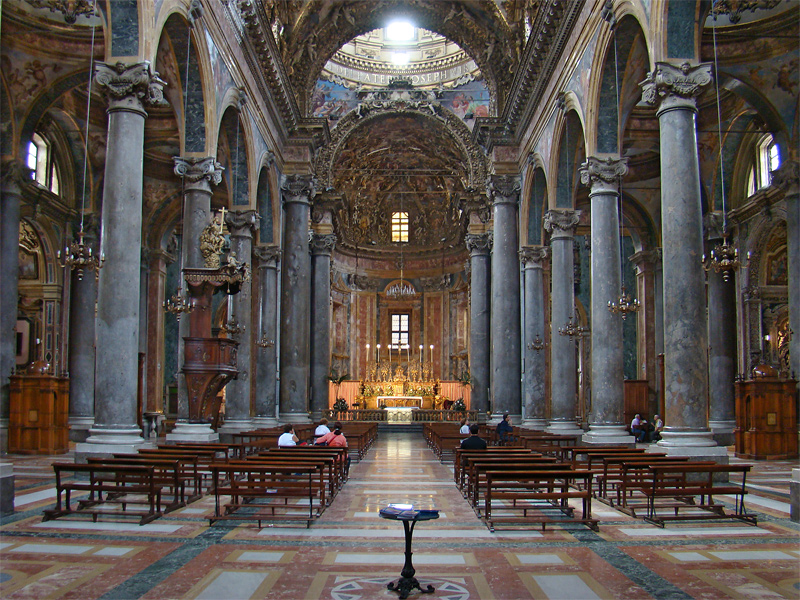
Apse in San Giuseppe dei Teatini church.

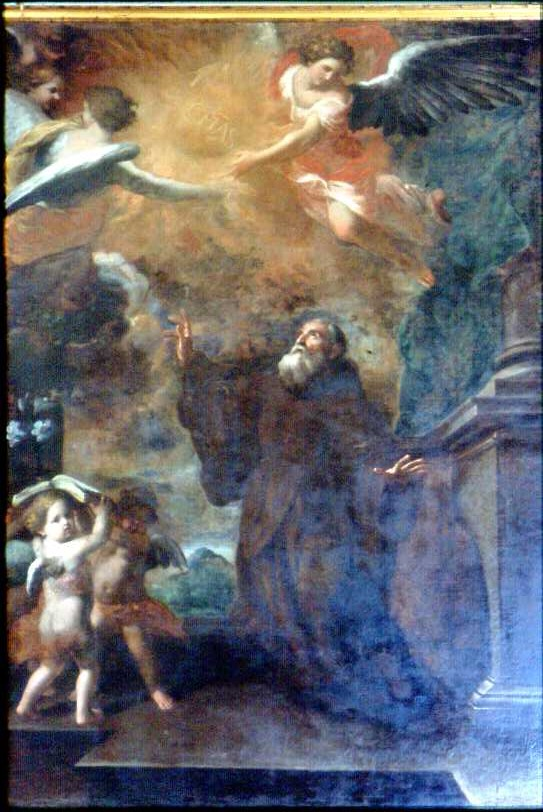
Saint Francis of Paola in the Badia Nuova in Alcamo

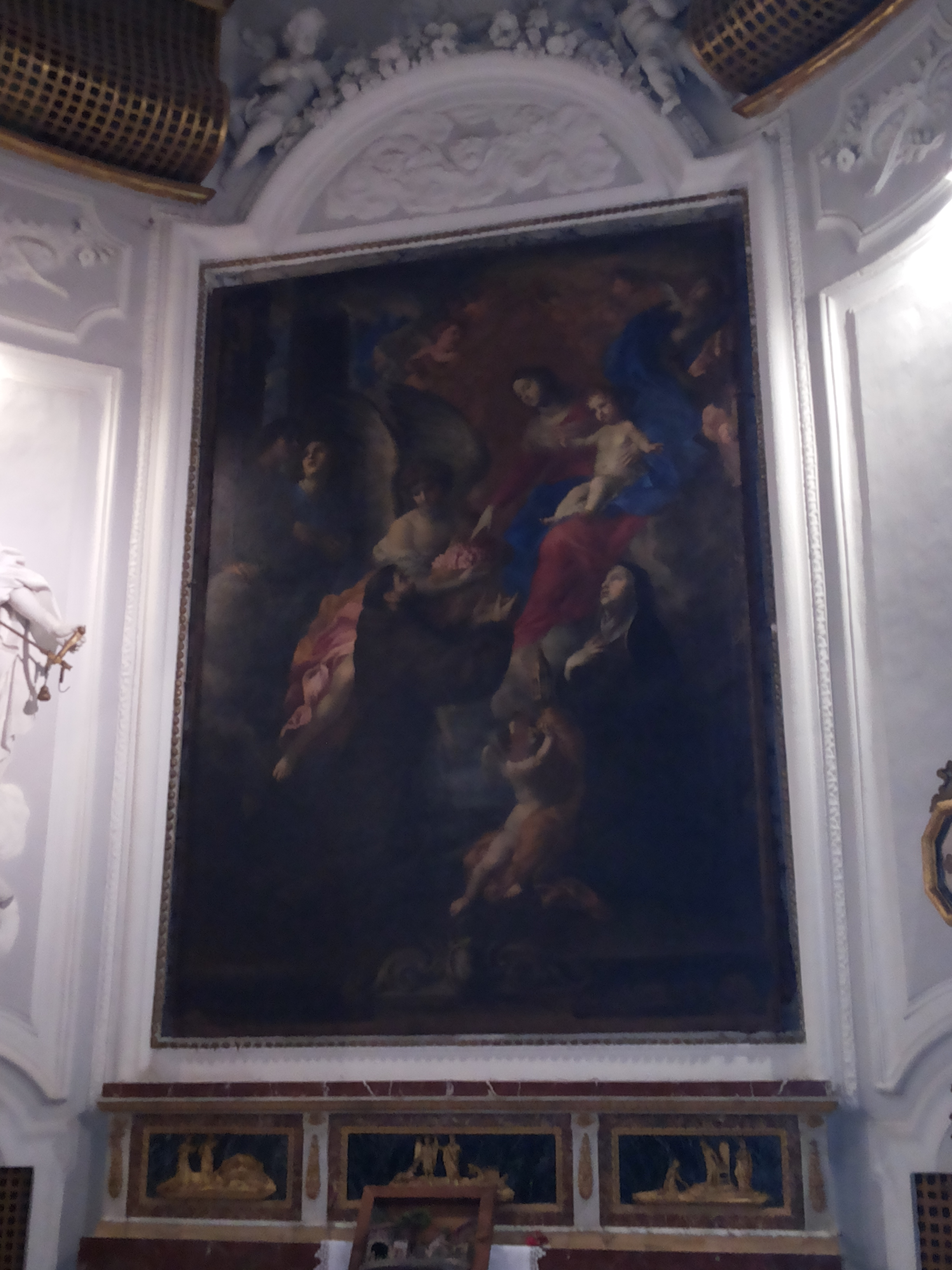
Madonna with Angels (1669)

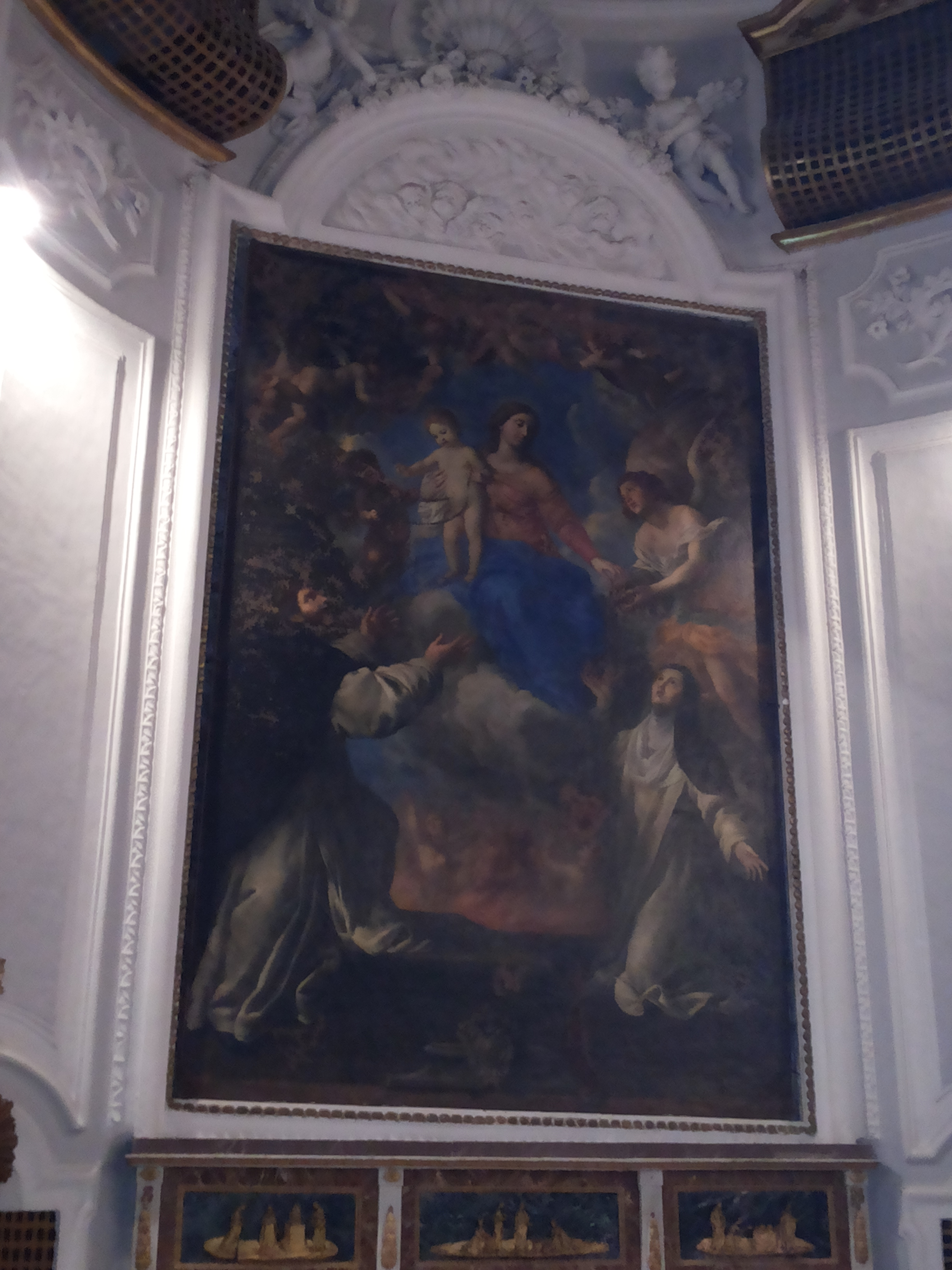
Madonna of the Rosary (1658)

== Bibliography (in Italian) ==
- Ulrich Thieme, Felix Becker, Enciclopedia Generale degli artisti dall'antichità ad oggi giorno, volume 6ª ed., Leipzig, EA Seemann, 1912.
- Mia Cinotti, Catalogo della pittura italiana dal '300 al' 700, Milano, Giorgio Mondadori & Associati, 1985.
- Teresa Pugliatti, Pittura del Cinquecento in Sicilia. La Sicilia Orientale, Napoli, Electa, 1993.
- Agostino Gallo, "Elogio storico di Pietro Novelli da Morreale in Sicilia, pittore, architetto e incisore", Terza edizione, Palermo, Reale Stamperia, 1830.
- Gaetano Bongiovanni, Quadri dal silenzio: un'inedita Natività di Andrea Carreca, in Santa Caterina al Cassaro: il monastero delle domenicane a Palermo, a cura di S. Lo Giudice, Palermo 2018, pp. 87–89.

== External links (in Italian) ==
- G. M. Di Ferro, Guida per gli stranieri in Trapani con un saggio storico, Trapani 1825, pp. 215–17, 258–261, 269, 272, 275, 293–96, 302;
- A. Gallo, Elogio storico di Pietro Novelli da Monreale..., Palermo 1828, pp. 111, 152–154;
- F. De Felice, Arte del Trapanese, Palermo 1936, pp. 79–85;
- P. Sgadari di Lo Monaco, Pitt. e scultori siciliani..., Palermo 1940, ad vocem;
- G. Agosta, La chiesa di S. Maria Odigitria (o Itria), in Trapani, II (1957), 8, pp. 13 s.;
- Id., Il "cromatismo" di A. van Dyck nella pittura di A. C., ibid., 9, pp. 1–14;
- II mostra di dipinti restaurati (catalogo), a cura di V. Scuderi, Trapani 1958, pp. 15–17;
- R. Grillo, Il culto di s. Carlo Borromeo a Palermo, in Arch. stor. lomb., XC (1963), p. 313;
- V. Scuderi, Il Museo naz. Pepoli in Trapani, Roma 1965, pp. 31 s.;
- VII mostra di opere d'arte restaurate(catal.), a cura di M. Stella, Trapani 1970, pp. 3 s.;
- L. Novara, A. Carreca pittore trapanese del '600, in Trapani, XXI (1976), 215, pp. 9–17;
