= Simone de Wobreck =

Flemish painter

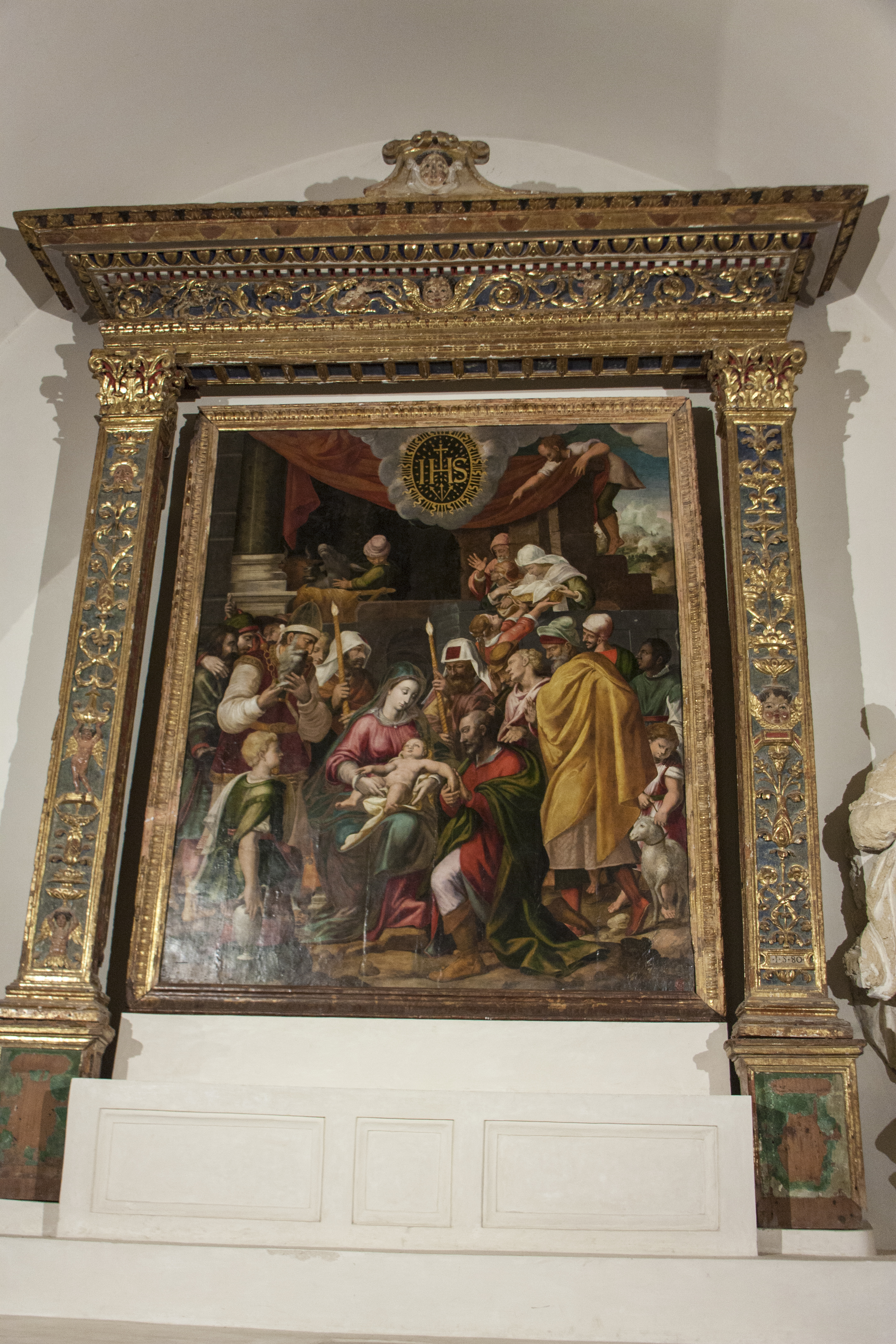
Circumcision of Christ, San Domenico Church in Castelvetrano

Simone De Wobreck was a 16th-century Flemish painter, whose known works all come from his long period in Sicily.

== Life ==
Born in Haarlem sometime between 1500 and 1550 and trained in Flanders, he arrived in Palermo on Sicily in 1558, summoned by the commission for a now-lost large canvas entitled The Feast in the House of Simon for the monastery of San Martino delle Scale - gaining such an important commission shows his good reputation had already reached Sicily. His experience was not unusual, with other Flemish artists such as Anthony van Dyck, Matthias Stom, Guglielmo Borremans and Jan Gossaert also coming to Sicily during its Renaissance, Baroque and late Baroque periods and working alongside native artists and architects such as the Serpotta and Gagini families, Angelo Italia and Paolo Amato.

After the San Martino commission he worked on the city's Palazzo Reale, previously partly abandoned but then being restored by Juan de Vega, the Spanish viceroy of the island. These works were continued by his successors Juan de la Cerda, Carlo d'Aragona Tagliavia and especially Marco Antonio Colonna who moved into the Palazzo from 24 April 1577 after a triumphal entry into the city and remained there until 1584. De Wobreck's contribution to the Palazzo's redirection was a Painting of the Island of Sicily (1560) and he later also restored the Palazzo's Sala delle Quattro Colonna (now known as the Sala dei Venti) with a new scheme of stained glass windows.

He also received commissions from important Sicilian noble families such as the Branciforte, who commissioned an oil painting of Madonna of the Graces and Child with St Francis of Paola and Saint Oliva, identified with that now in the Sala Verde of the Palazzo Abatellis alongside two other works by De Wobreck. He then began focussing on religious themes with Pentecost (1562, Palazzo Abatellis) for the hall of the city's Ospedale Magno, St William (1567) still hanging in its original position in Sant'Agostino, Assumption of the Virgin (1581, Palazzo Abatellis)

His fame also spread and he was summoned to other noble and religious commissions elsewhere on Sicily, such as Christ on the Way to Calvary (1582), now in Caccamo Cathedral but for a time in San Francesco church in the same city. The work drew on Raphael's Christ Falling on the Way to Calvary, then hanging in Santa Maria dello Spasimo in Palermo and now in the Museo del Prado in Madrid. De Wobreck also produced another work on the subject for the church of Santa Maria Maddalena in Ciminna, whilst in 1585 he produced three works - a Madonna of the Rosary with the Mysteries (now in the Pinacoteca del Castello di Grifeo in Partanna), Adoration of the Magi for Tre Re Orientali church in Catania (now in that city's Museo Civico in Castello Ursino) and Flagellation (Palermo Diocesan Museum)

De Wobreck's reputation also attracted several pupils such as Giulio Mosca and Domenico Nore to his studio. His last surviving work, Saint Sebastian was produced for a chapel at Sant'Agostino in 1587 with assistance from Mosca. He was a close friend of Giovanni Paolo Fondulli, a painter from Cremona who spent a few years in Palermo, producing an Annunciation for its church of Santa Maria di Porto Salvo. After being active in Palermo for over thirty years, he died in the city between 1587 and 1597 and was buried at San Marco church in the city. The last record of him in his lifetime dates to 1587 and the production of Saint Sebastian. He is next recorded in 1597 as already being dead and buried in the wills of Mosca (stating a wish to be buried beside his late master) and de Wobreck's widow Maddalena (who also asked to be buried in San Marco).

== Works ==
- 1580, Circumcision of Christ, San Domenico church in the Dominican priory at Castelvetrano.
- 1580–1581, Madonna of the Rosary with Saints, painting on panel, originally in San Giacomo dei Militari church, now in the Sala Torre (temporary exhibition) at the Museo diocesano, both in Palermo.
- 1585, Adoration of the Magi, for Tre Re Orientali Church in Catania, now in Castello Ursino, Catania
- 1586, Virgin Mary with Saints Agatha, Oliva, Stephen and Bartholomew, painting on panel, Sant'Agata delle Scorruggie alle Mura church, Palermo.

Undated

- Saint Ursula with Scenes from her Life, collection of the museo diocesano but displayed in the St Ursula Chapel of Santissimo Salvatore, Palermo.
- Adoration of the Magi, San Francesco d'Assisi church, Enna.
- Altarpiece, chiesa del Rosario, Dominican monastery of San Domenico di Guzman, Isnello.
- Christ, Santi Vito e Francesco church, Monreale.
