= Michele Blasco =

Italian painter and architect (1628–1685)

Michele Blasco (1628–1685) was an Italian painter and architect, active in his native Sicily, mainly painting in sacred subjects in a Baroque style.

== Biography ==
Born in Sciacca to noble and primary family originally from Spain, he was initially enrolled in religious studies locally, then in Girgenti and finally Catania. Soon his interest in art showed through and his family relented to him studying in Palermo with Pietro Novelli. In Palermo, he was influenced by the styles of Ribera and van Dyck.

Returning to Sciacca, Michele painted a San Tommaso da Villanova for the church of Santa Maria del Soccorso. He painted an Annunciation for the Chiesa del Collegio in Sciacca. He painted a St Antony Abbot for the oratory church of the Carmine. He painted a St Stephen and Martyr for the church of Santa Margherita.

He built a new church (after 1656) to replace the Norman church with the Basilica Maria Santissima del Soccorso in Baroque style. He was buried in the church of San Francesco in Sciacca. He died in Sciacca in 1685 and was buried in the chapel of the Testone family, in the Church of the Convent of San Francesco outside the city walls. His grandson Gaspare Testone was also a local painter.
