= Compagnia dell'Immacolata Concezione =

Religious confraternity founded in 1596

The Compagnia dell'Immacolata Concezione is a religious confraternity founded in 1596 inside the Church of Saint Francis of Assisi in Alcamo, in the province of Trapani.

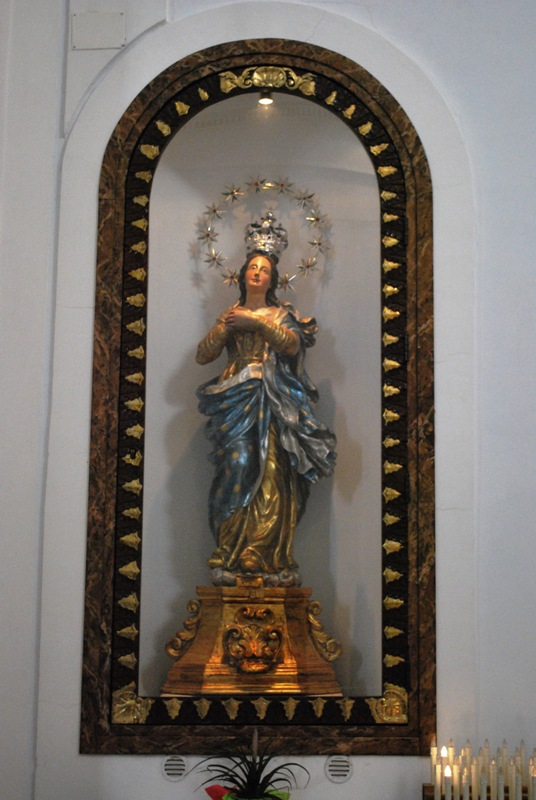
Wooden statue of Maria Santissima Immacolata

== History ==
At page 455 of Discorso Storico nella Opulenta Città di Alcamo by Ignazio De Blasi (historian), edited copy, you can textually read: n°9- Nel recinto delle mura di questo convento ritrovasi l'oratorio della Compagnia dell'Immacolata Concezione di Maria, la quale nella di lui chiesa tiene anche; la sua cappella fabbricata a spese dei confrati a cagione dell'aggregazione fatta con questo Convento negli atti del notar Filippo Mercadante, nel 1 luglio, 8 ind. 1595, o 9 ind.1596; dietro di che la fondazione di questa Compagnia allora Confraternita colla sua Cappella si effettuò per pubblico atto in Notar Antonino Vaccaro li 9 Gennaio Xind. 1596. In detta Cappella vi è il quadro dell'Immacolata Signora con cornice di marmo rosso e nel tetto di essa Cappella vi sono 34 quadri dei Santi, e nel mezzo vi è altro quadro di Maria SS. Immacolata con sua cornice dorata, il quale tetto si coprì di detti quadri nell'anno 1613, a spese delli confrati della Concezione, avendo fatto fare ognuno il suo quadro per devozione con scrivergli anche il suo nome.

The historian, originary from Alcamo, describes the presence of the Company and the Chapel with the adjoining oratory in the Church of Saint Francis of Assisi in this way. Its possible founder was Father Giuseppe Terrana, guardian of the friary for several years: a group of people undertook to form the Confraternity, regulated by some chapters (religion) which were later inserted into the new ones. On 30 July 1596, after a trial period of one year, the act was renewed: the Community of the friary, besides Father Giuseppe Terrana, was represented by the Fathers Nicolò Badalucco, Palma Pietro, Nicolantonio Centorbi and Fra' Vincenzo Sutera.

They signed some agreements with the Confraternity of the Immaculate, represented by Vincenzo Cucinario Lo Vinario, governor (=President), the councillors, the master Vincenzo La Ghirlanda, the chancellor Leonardo da Messana and the cashier Michelangelo Ferrara. Following this enactment, the monastery annexed the Confraternity and undertook to take part in the legacies of maritaggio and gave it a warehouse against a charge. The Confraternity made the commitments to celebrate the festivity of the Immaculate every year, to leave the wax offered for its dead brethren to the friary, take part in the procession of Corpus Domini and carry the baldachin; they also were allowed to receive alms, goods and administer them.

After the first approval of its Statute by the bishop Luciano de Rubeis in 1599, it was approved for the second time in 1697, with some additions and a praise by the bishop Bartolomeo Castelli. The eulogy was for some chapters which were enunciated in a very wise way: in fact the brethren's number does not have to exceed 50 (because multitude badly ordered degenerates into confusion), the administrators, over-25, last only one year acciocché ognuno delli fratelli partecipino dell'honoranze e delle fatiche (cap.III) (=in this way each brother can take part in the honours and labour), li fratelli debbiano essere sempre honesti e non giocare a giochi proibiti, ne quelli star a vedere, ne mai biasimare ne mai mormorare ne dir male di alcuna persona, conservando i matrimoni come sonno obbligati per legge divina, e l'altri vivere in castità e pudicitia (cap.XVI). (that is: "They must be honest and not to play forbidden games, neither watch other playing them, never blame or denigrate any people, saving their weddings in the way they are obliged by divine law, and the unmarried live in chastity and prudery".).

This old Statute was abrogated in the 1954, when the Curia Vescovile of Trapani stated a new one by decree, removing some initial rites and duties; besides, it qualified the Company as a Confraternity. At the beginning the Confraternity was made up with civilian people, teachers and priests"; today most of the brethren belong to the working class. It is one of the oldest confraternities that pursues for the Immaculate Conception, preparing the solemn festivity with a novenary. In 1600 every congregation, confraternity or company adopted its own tunic with a visor which prevented others to recognize their members. Later the brethren wearing this garment were called wolves, because of this mask. Today the members of the Compagnia dell'Immacolata still wear a white tunic with a cincture and a small mantle with a white visor on their heads.

== Description ==
=== The Chapel ===
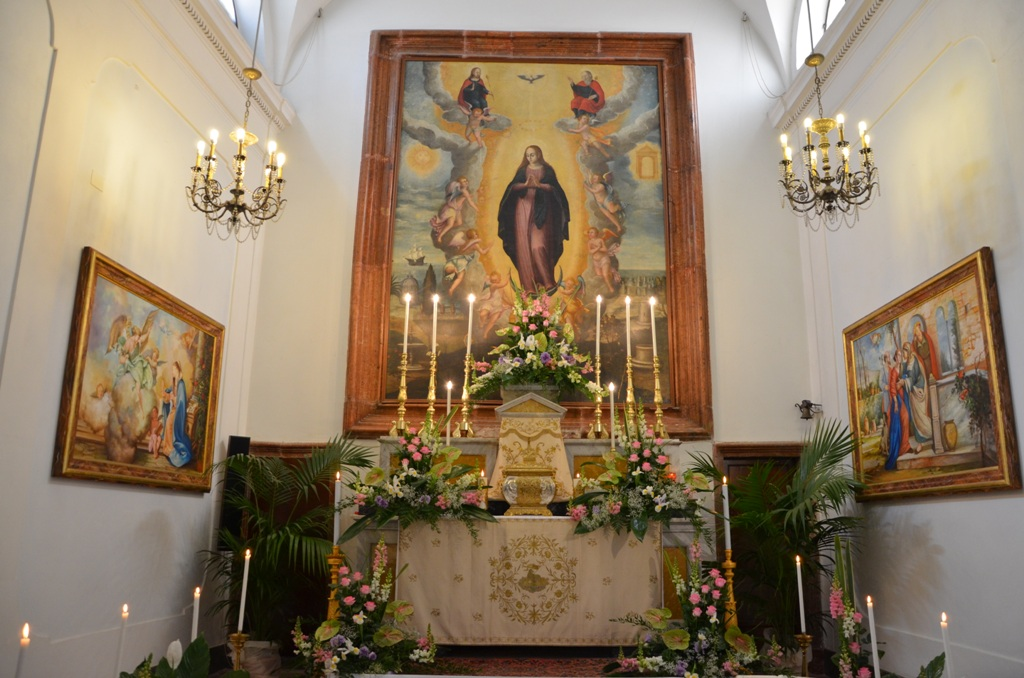
The Chapel of the Immaculate

The Company has its own chapel inside the Church of Saint Francis of Assisi, located on the right side of the entrance of the Church. They celebrated here all the religious functions provided by the Statute: the introduction of new members, the washing of 12 brethren by the Governor on Maundy Thursday, the office for the dead members' burial, and the weekly meetings which took place every Saturday (the so-called sabatini).

On both sides of the first part of the chapel they buried some friars of the Order of Friars Minor Conventual: at the corner of the pillar on the left there is a stone clothing and the stairs leading to the big sepulture where they buried the dead brethren, due to the shortage of cemeteries. Inside the chapel, besides the painting made by Giuseppe Carrera and the wooden statue placed in the niche, there are 4 paintings realized by Rosolino La Mattina which represent the most important circumstances during the life of the Virgin Immaculate: the Visitation (Christianity), the Annunciation, the Marriage, the Nativity of Jesus. On the ceiling, on the occasion of the Great Jubilee, the same painter made a fresco representing God the Father while creating the Virgin of the Immaculate Conception, by painting her like a picture.

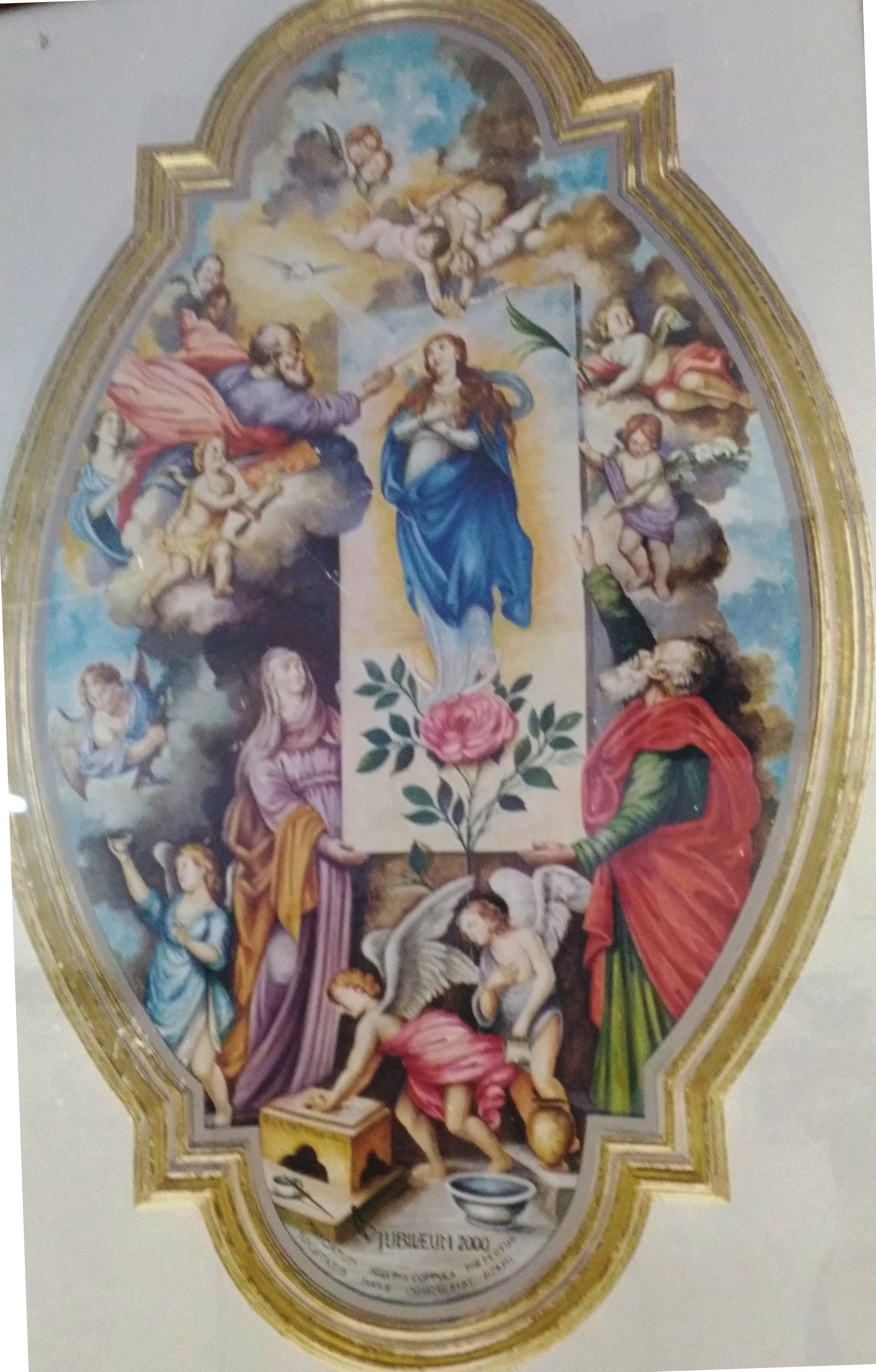
Fresco by Rosolino La Mattina

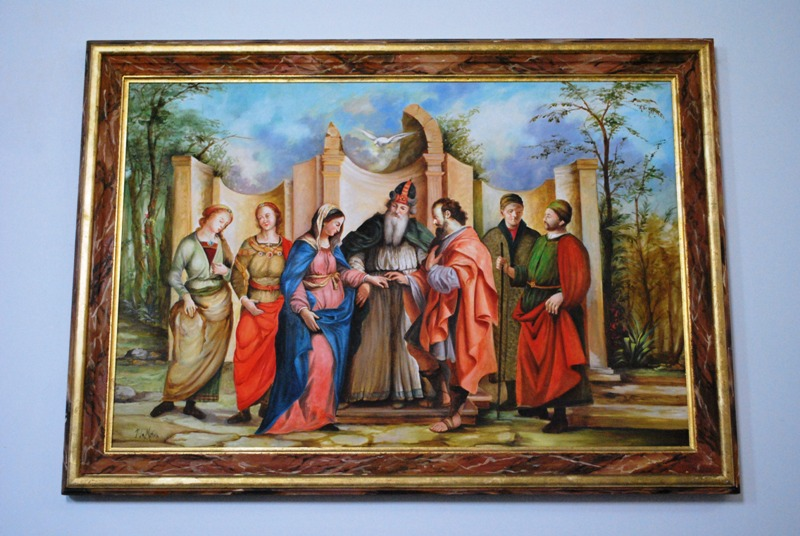
The Marriage

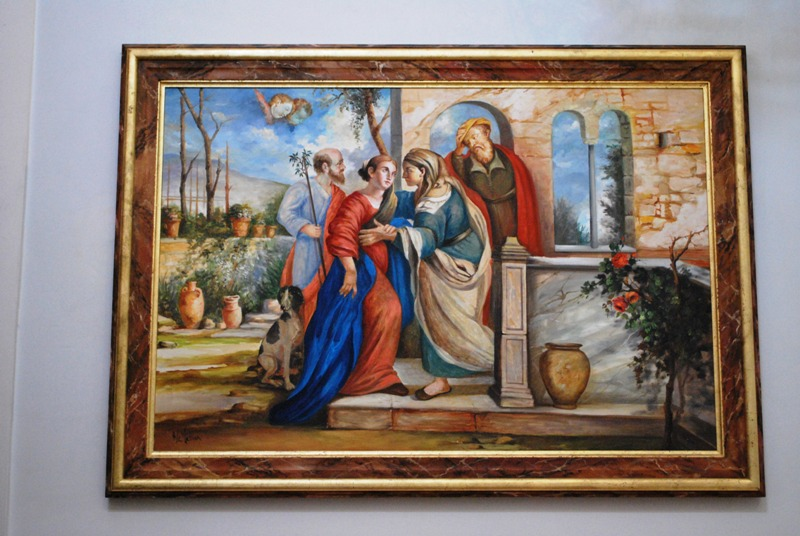
The Visitation

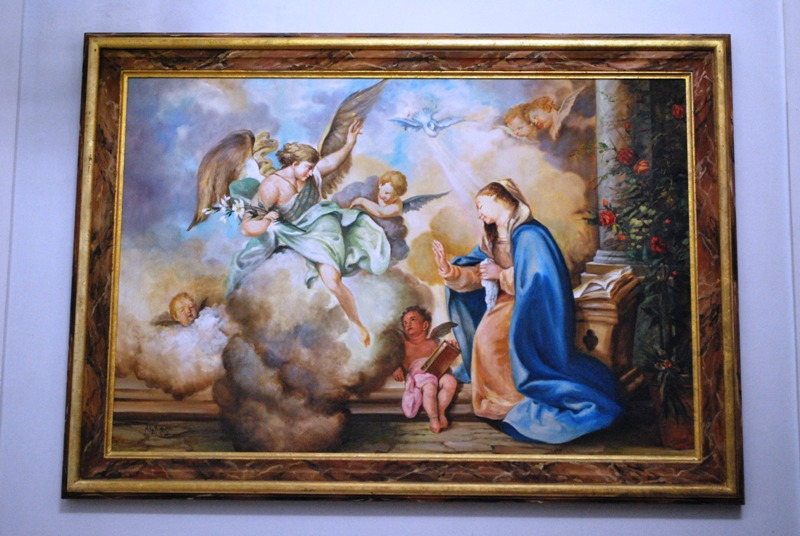
The Annunciation

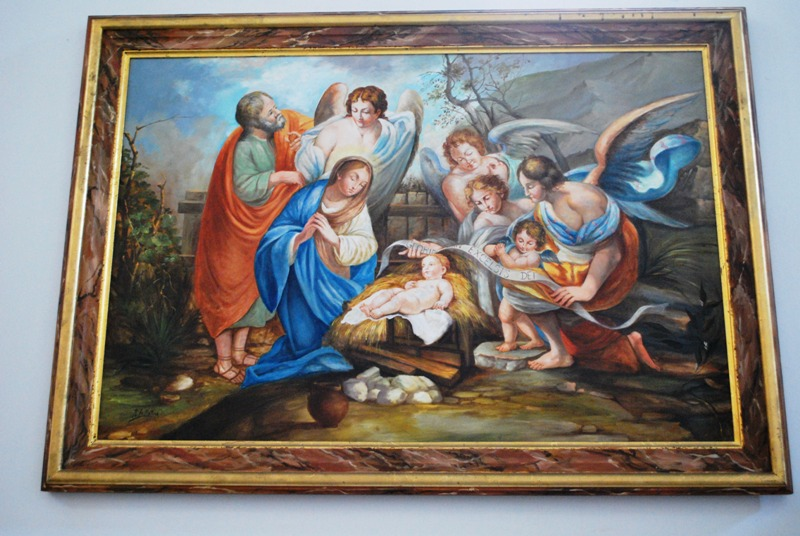
The Nativity of Jesus

=== Paintings by Carrera ===
On 8 February 1610 the Administration in charge, negotiated the painting of a picture of Maria Santissima Immacolata and some others on the ceiling of the first part of the chapel, with Giuseppe Carrera, a painter from Trapani.

Carrera had to paint a picture large 4 metres by 2,75 metres, representing the Immaculate Conception with the crescent under her feet and the symbols of her mysteries, and also 34 paintings, 4 palms large and 13 centimetres high, with the image chosen by the member paying for its cost, with the right to put his name and the family crest. The works were completed in 1613: the 34 paintings existed until 1927, then they were destroyed due to the spoiling of the ceiling following the leaking of rainwater.

=== The Statue ===
The present wooden statue, venerated in the Church, was carved in 1695 by Ignazio Ingrassia (a sculptor from Trapani) at the expense of the members of the Company. It was gilded by Mariano Pisano: in 1738 this coating was modified by Gioacchino Restivo. The statue, instead, has recently been restored in 1982 and in 2013.

=== The festivity ===
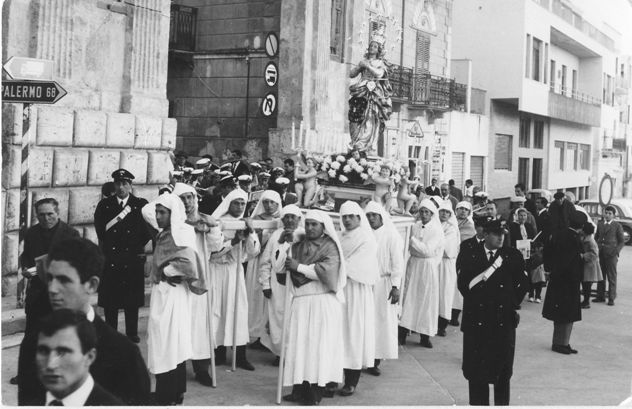
The Procession of 8 December (in the '60s)

During the days before the feast of 8 December there is a solemn novenary and the simulacrum of the Immaculate is placed on the high altar; they put some decorations on the walls and embellish the altar with flowers. After the recital of the Rosary, a Father expert in homiletics, usually a stranger, will preside the Holy Mass. In ancient times it was a pleasure to listen to these sermons, as they were real orators.

After Mass they say the Stellario, and finally there is the benediction with the Blessed Sacrament. On the eve of the feast, after the evening Mass, there are the solemn Vespers, with the presence of the Arcipriest of Alcamo, the believers, the members of Compagnia dell'Immacolata, the civil and military authorities. Since 1948, following the official invitation by Salvatore Pugliesi (president of the Company at that time), the Lord Mayor, his municipal Administration, together with the other authorities and the Clergy, take part in the Vespers of the eve, the morning solemn Mass of 8 December, presided by the Bishop or his Vicary, and finally, in the afternoon procession.

Every year, since 1954 (Marian year) on the eve of the festivity of the Immaculate, the Lord Mayor offers a Church candle, 5 kilos heavy, to Our Lady and entrusts the town under her protection. After the end of Vespers the Premiato Complesso Bandistico "Città di Alcamo", whose service has been paid by the municipal Administration for more than 100 years, play the two characteristic pastorals (called "ninnareddi" in sicilian) composed by the bandmasters Surdi and Barbera; at dawn of 8 December, the Band goes round the town and plays these melodious pastorals.

=== Stellario ===
Stellario is a prayer referring to the crown with twelve stars placed on the head of the statues and pictures of The Virgin Mary: it has inspired this ancient devotion: the stellario of the Immaculate, with the 12 blessings given by the Holy Trinity to Her.

During the prayer they contemplate the privileges of Mary, in groups of four, each one preceded by the Lord's Prayer and a Gloria Patri; at the end of every privilege they say a Hail Mary. Then there are three Lord's Prayers, three Gloria and 12 Hail Marys; finally a prayer of entrusting to the Immaculate. In Alcamo the 12 verses are alternated in this way: one is sung, the other is said.

=== Saint Benedict Joseph Labre ===
As this saint wanted to visit the Sanctuary of Madonna of Miracles of Alcamo, he lodged in the Oratory of the Compagnia dell'Immacolata four days in 1777: then he went to Erice on foot, and visited also the sanctuary of Maria Santissima of Custonaci and then the sanctuary of Madonna of Trapani. He finally arrived in Rome on the Wednesday of the Holy Week and died there on 16 April 1783.

In 1883, on the first centenary of his death, Giuseppe Provenzano (President of the Company pro tempore) commissioned the painting of a portrait of this saint to Nicolò Pizzitola, a painter from Alcamo. In 1983 it was restored by Professore Rosolino La Mattina from Palermo.

=== Administration ===
According to its statute, the Confraternity is run by an administration, elected by the members every 3 years, and is formed by the President, 2 administrators, the Secretary, the cashier, the prefect and the Master of Novices, chosen by the Parson of the Church.

Within a week, the procès-verbal of the election is sent to the Bishop for its approval; then the new administrators are in charge. The last four presidents are: Salvatore Pugliesi, Antonino Corrao, Giuseppe Coppola and Gian Battista Giaconia (in charge at present).

== See also ==
- Church of Saint Francis of Assisi (Alcamo)
- Alcamo
- Giuseppe Carrera
- Saint Benedict Joseph Labre

== Bibliografia ==
- Regina, Vincenzo (1995). Una compagnia quattro volte centenaria e l'Immacolata nel culto e nell'iconografia alcamese. Cassa Rurale ed Artigiana di Alcamo "Don Rizzo".
- Di Blasi, Ignazio. Discorso Storico della Opulenta Città di Alcamo.
- Cataldo, Carlo (1999). La Casa del Sole. Alcamo: Grafiche Campo.
- Cataldo, Carlo (2001). La conchiglia di S. Giacomo. Alcamo: Grafiche Campo.
- Cataldo, Carlo (1992). I giardini di Adone-Fede, feste e sinodi diocesani nel folklore di Alcamo p.319-323. Alcamo: Ed. Grafiche Campo.
