= Pietro Novelli =

Italian painter (1603–1647)

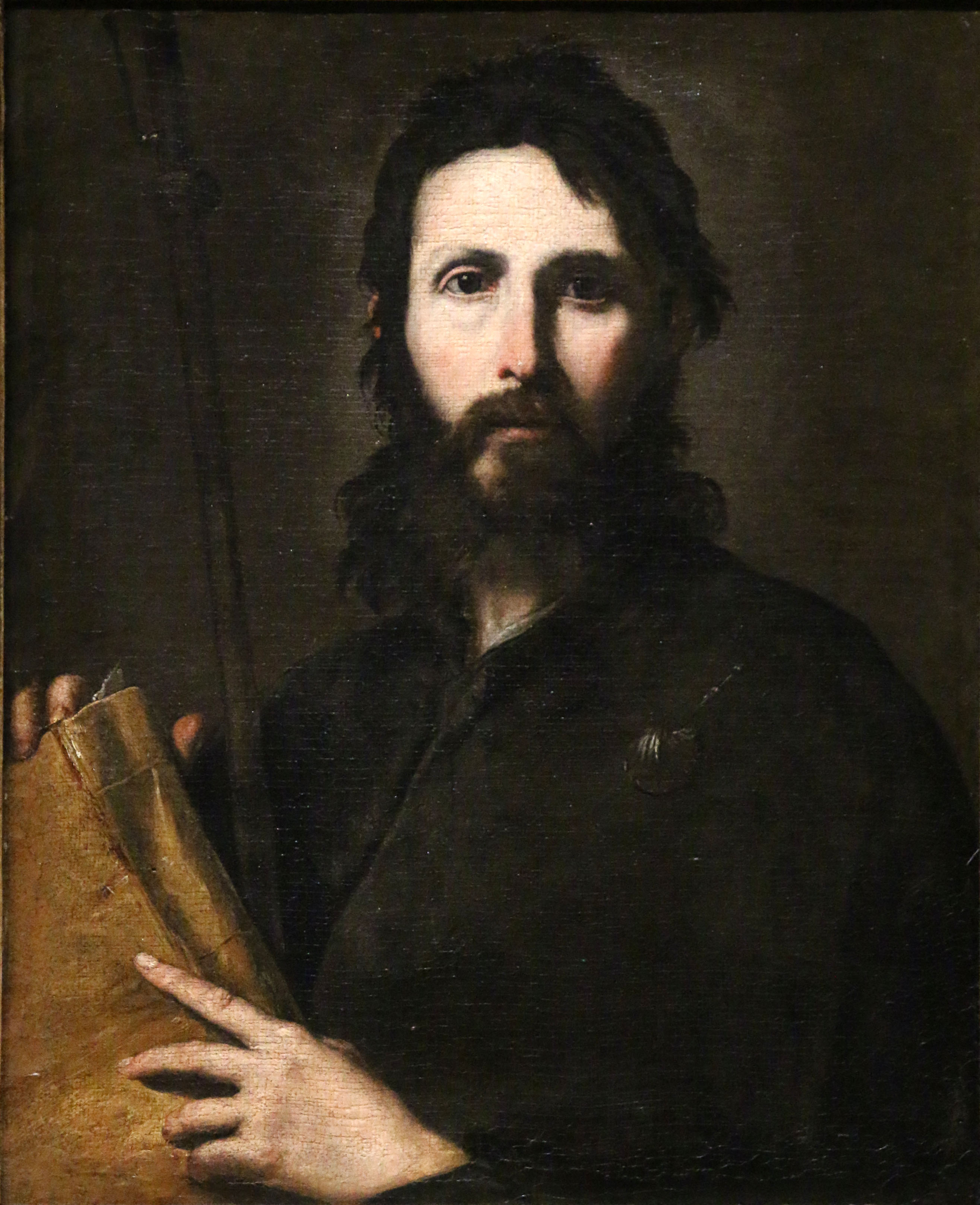
- St. James the Great, Musée des beaux-arts de Marseille
- Born: 2 March 1603; Monreale, Sicily
- Died: 27 August 1647 (aged 44); Palermo, Sicily
- Education: Pietro Antonio Novelli; Vito Carrera
- Known for: Painting
- Movement: Baroque

Pietro Novelli (2 March 1603 – 27 August 1647) was an Italian painter of the Baroque period, active mainly in Palermo. Also known as il Monrealese or Pietro "Malta" Novelli to distinguish him from his father, Pietro Antonio Novelli. He was also nicknamed by contemporaries as the Raphael of Sicily.

== Biography ==
He was born in Monreale and died in Palermo. He initially trained with his father, a painter and mosaicist. His father died in 1625 from the bubonic plague. As a young apprentice he was a fellow pupil with Gerardo Astorino. In 1618, he moved to Palermo and apprenticed with Vito Carrera and studied perspective with the mathematician Carlo Maria Ventimiglia. His first dated work is from 1626: St. Anthony Abbot for the church of Sant'Antonio Abate in Palermo. The development of his style owed much to Anthony van Dyck, who visited Sicily in 1624 and whose altarpiece, the Madonna of the Rosary in the oratory of Santa Maria del Rosario in Palermo, was highly influential for local artists.

Also important for Novelli's artistic development was the time he spent in Rome and Naples c. 1630/31–3. In Rome he probably studied the works of Raphael and Michelangelo, of Caravaggio and the Bolognese painters (especially Giovanni Lanfranco and Domenichino), Pietro da Cortona, Nicolas Poussin and Diego Velázquez. In Naples he came into contact with the works of Jusepe de Ribera and with the contemporary Neapolitan naturalist painters, and he was deeply affected by the art of Andrea Vaccaro and Massimo Stanzione.

A direct influence from Caravaggio can be seen in the fresco of Daniel in the Lions' Den (Naples, San Martino delle Scale), where the angel is derived from that in Caravaggio's Nativity (Palermo, San Lorenzo). Novelli returned to Sicily in 1637. Probably soon thereafter he painted Judith and Holofernes (Royal Palace of Naples), which shows his close links with Artemisia Gentileschi and Ribera. The Trinity Sending the Archangel Gabriel to the Virgin (Naples, Museo di Capodimonte), which also postdates his time in Naples, is an eclectic work in which the elegance and idealism of van Dyck blend with the naturalism of Caravaggio or Ribera. Other works of the 1630s, which opened the most productive phase of Novelli's career, include the canvas of St. Benedict Distributing Bread to the Religious Orders (Monreale, abbey of San Martino), the Virgin with St. Rosalie and St. John the Baptist (c. 1635; Palermo, Galleria Regionale della Sicilia) and St. John the Baptist Preaching (Palermo, San Giovanni alla Guilla).

At the end of the 1630s and the beginning of the 1640s, he produced some fresco cycles (e.g. Life of Viceroy Moncada, 1637–40; Palermo, Palazzo dei Normanni), in which the influences of Guido Reni, Lanfranco and, especially, Domenichino are discernible. In the last years of his life, he painted for the church of San Matteo in Palermo the Presentation in the Temple and the Marriage of the Virgin (1647).

Novelli was injured during the revolution in Palermo in 1647, and died from his wounds. His pupils included Andrea Carreca, Francesco Maggiotto, Francesco Giselli, Michele Blasco, Vincenzo Marchese, Giacomo lo Verde, and Macri da Girgenti. He was also an architect and stage set designer.

== Gallery ==
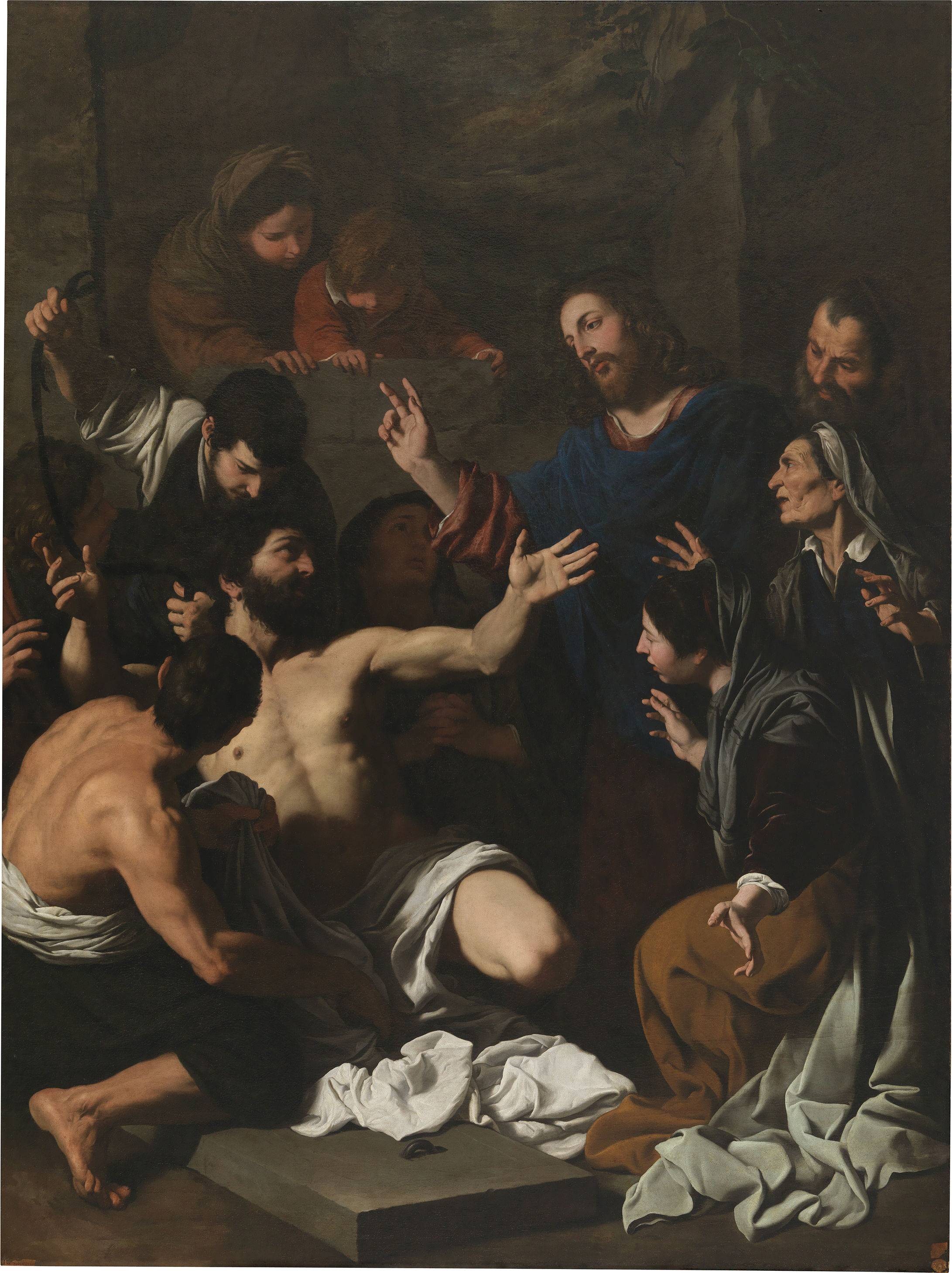
Resurrection of Lazarus, Museo del Prado, Madrid

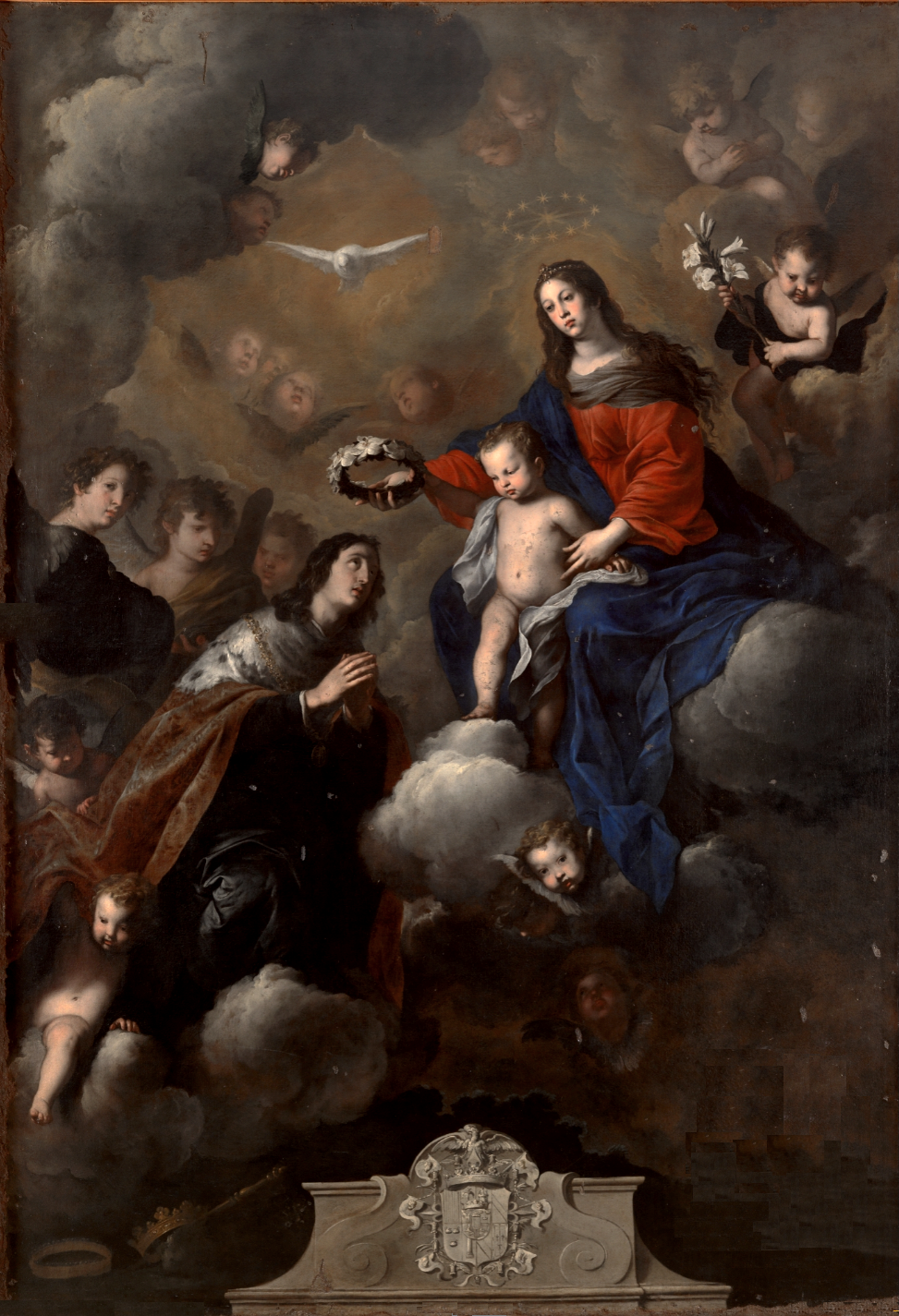
The Coronation of Saint Casimir, Galleria Regionale della Sicilia, Palermo

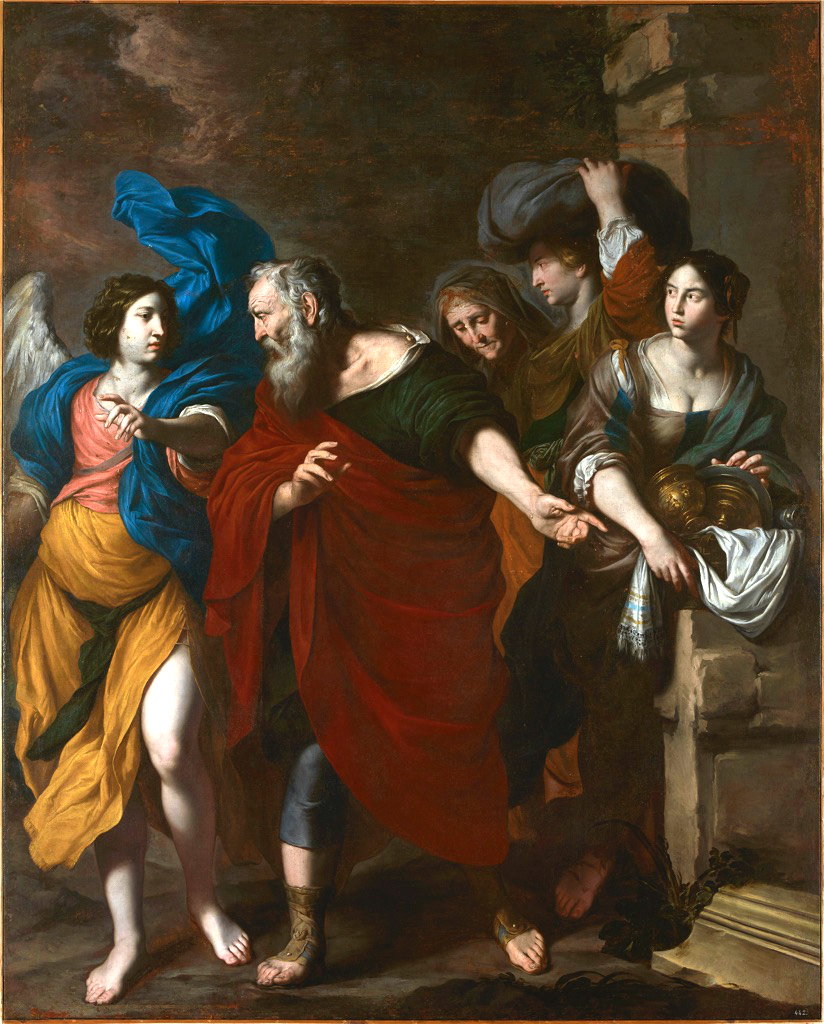
Lot and his Family, Royal Site of San Lorenzo de El Escorial, Madrid

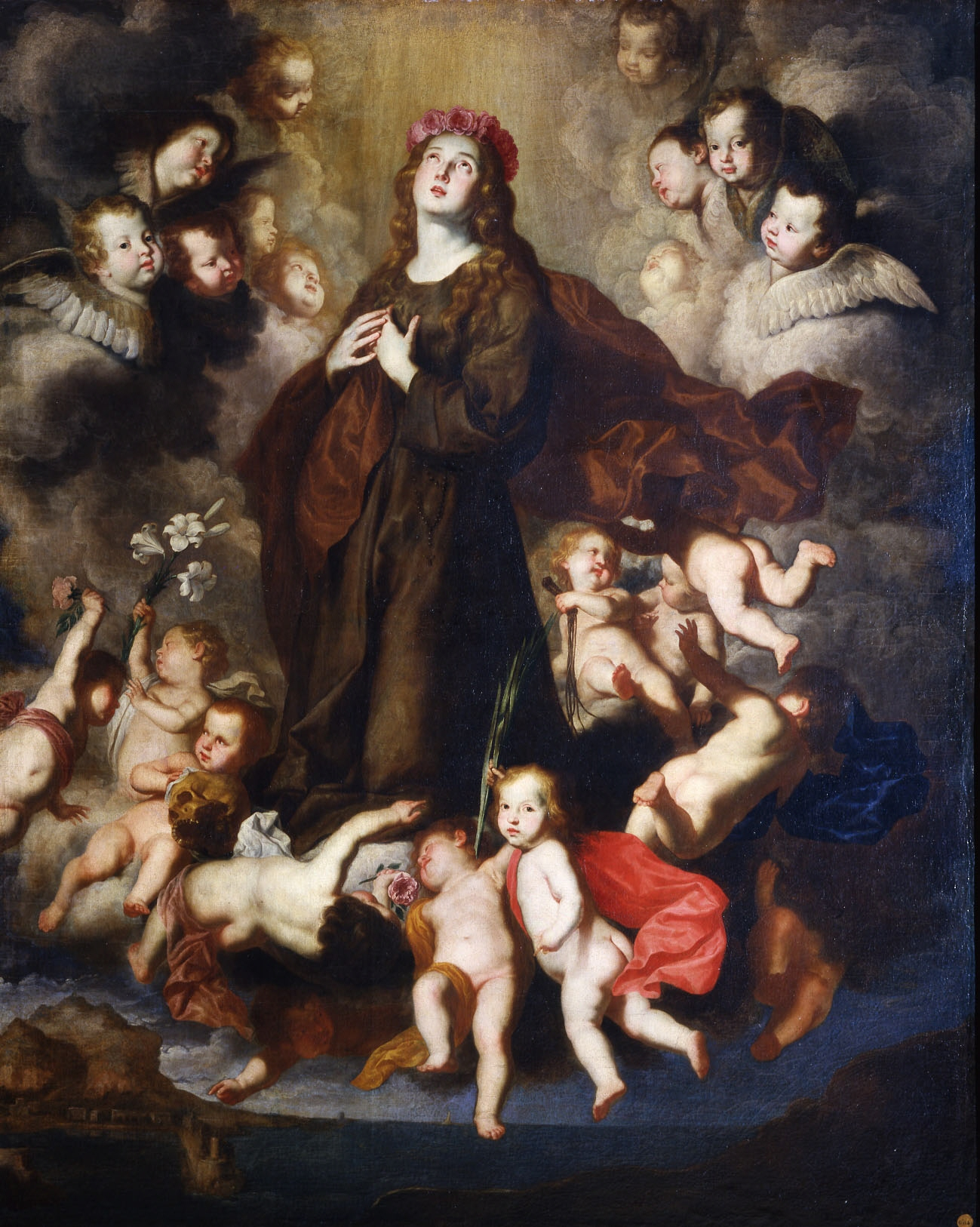
Saint Rosalia, Royal Academy of Fine Arts of San Fernando, Madrid

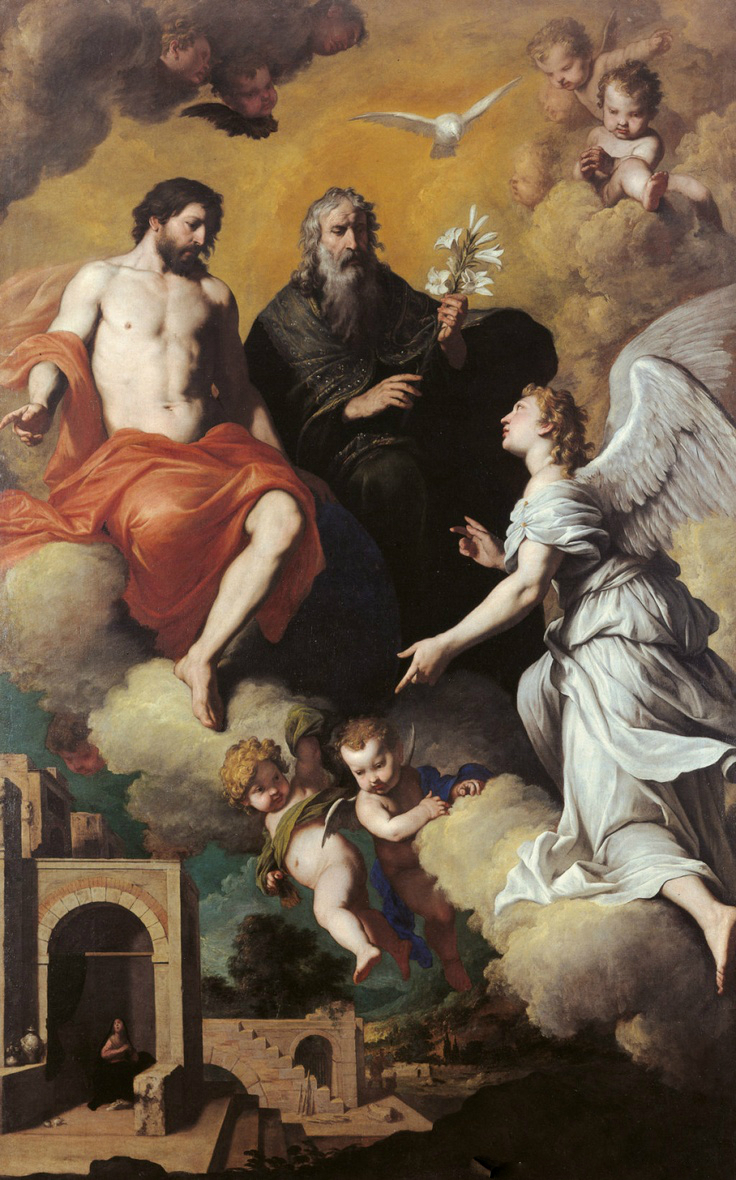
The Archangel Gabriel, Museo di Capodimonte, Naples

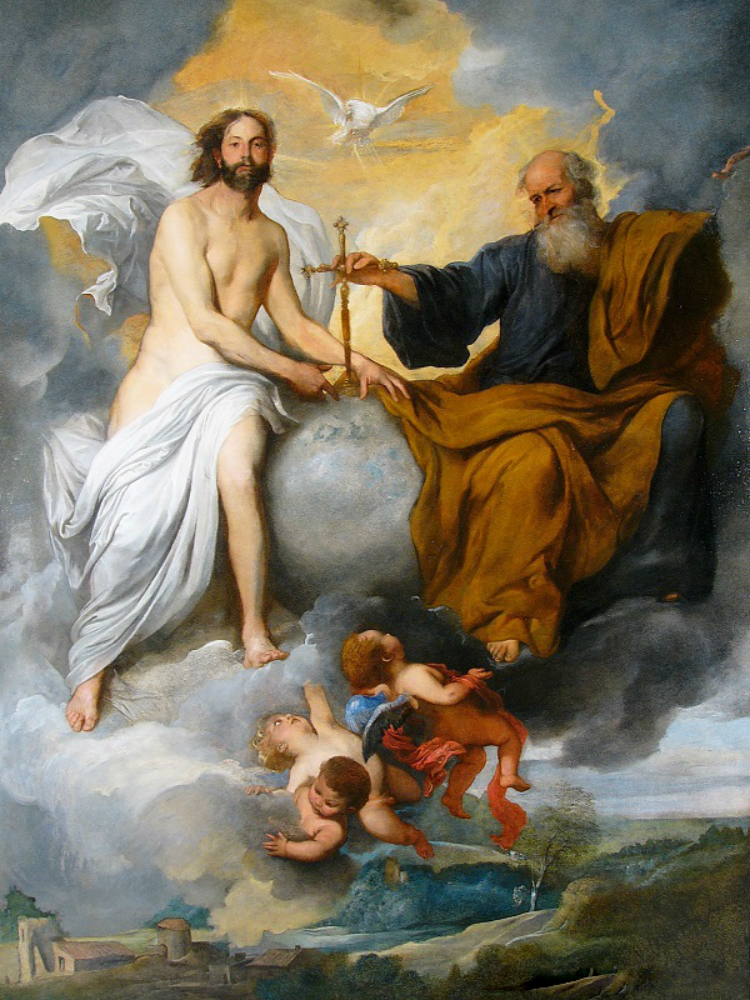
The Holy Trinity, Museum of Fine Arts, Budapest

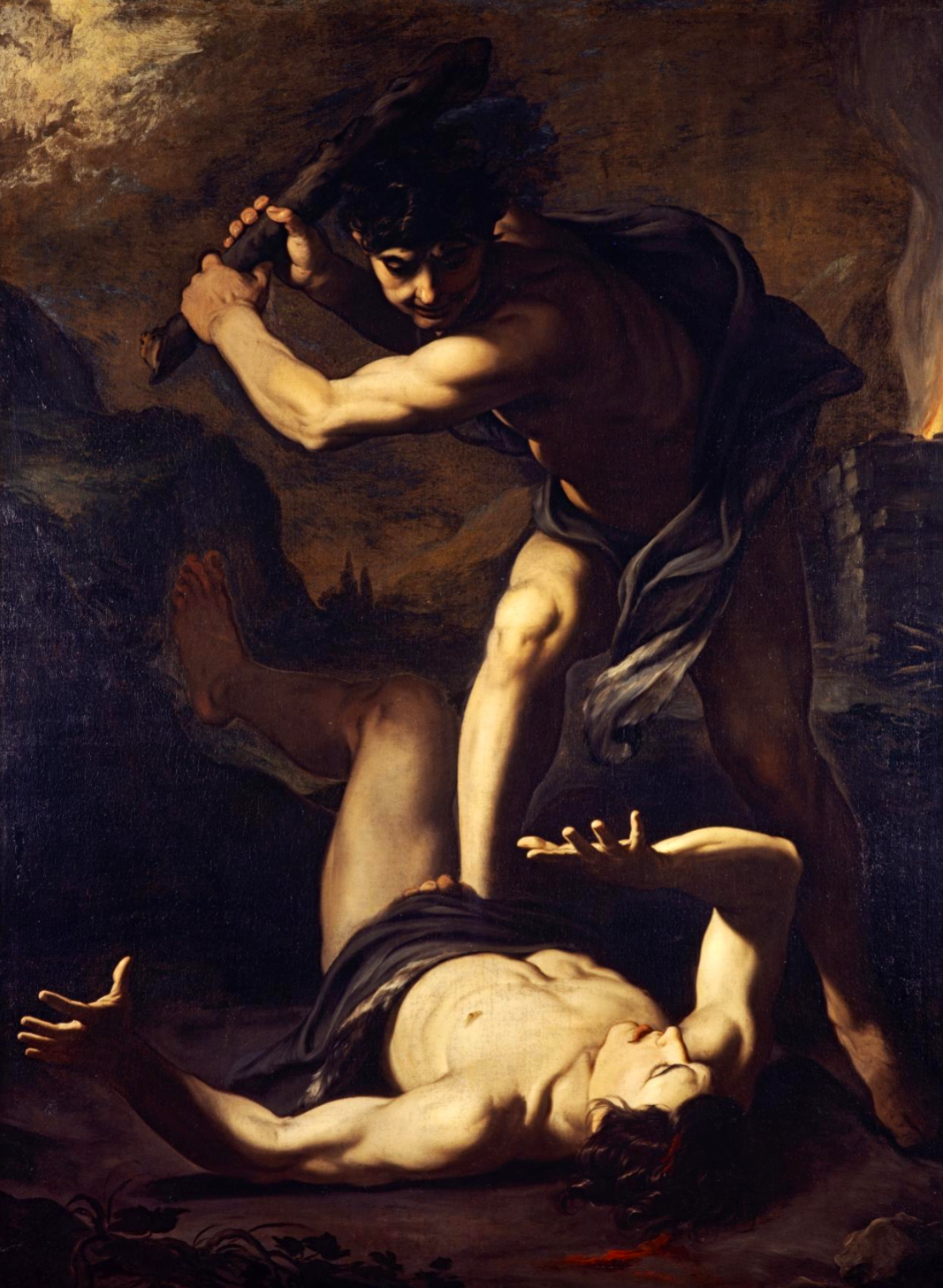
Cain killing Abel, National Galleries of Scotland, Edinburgh

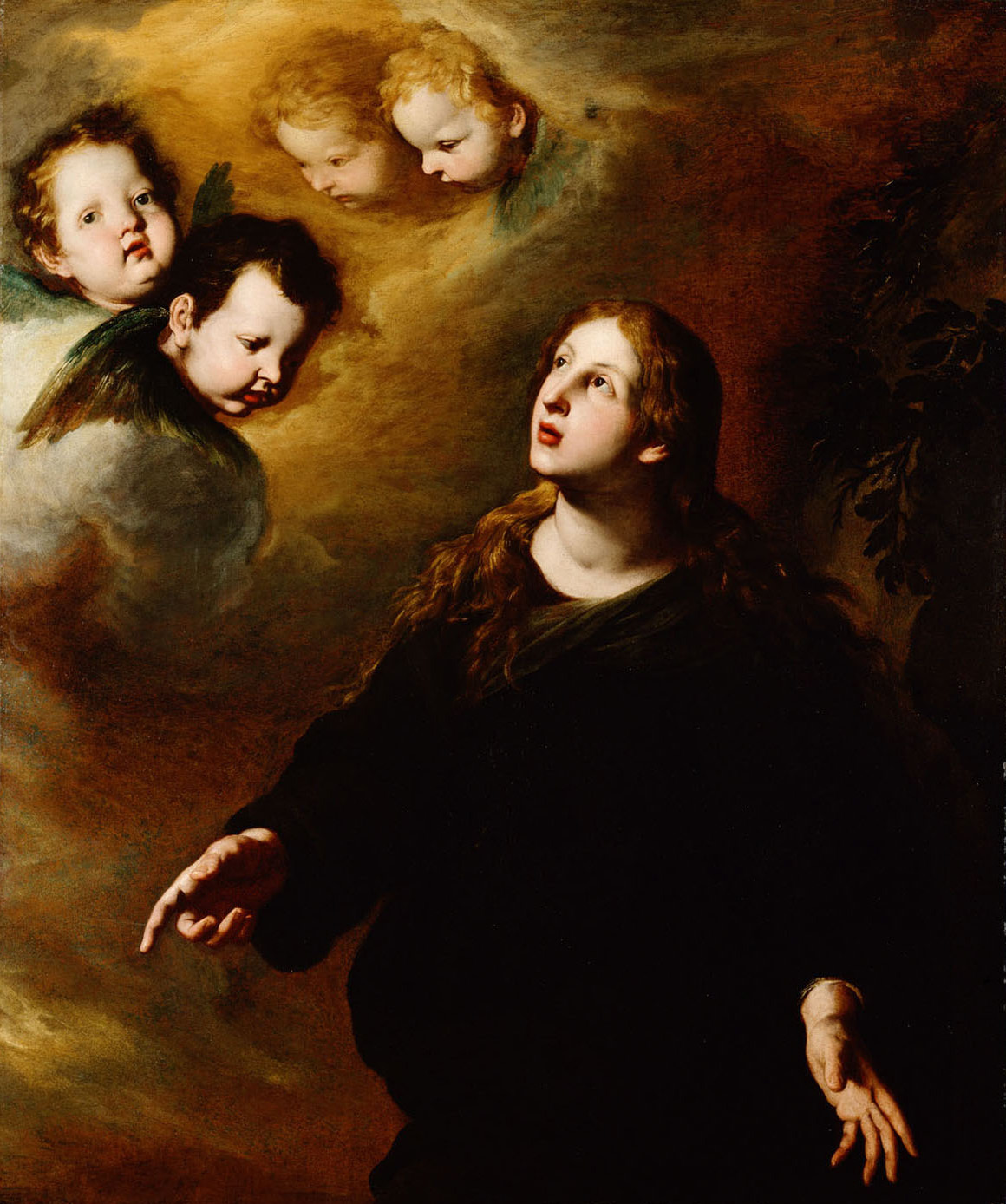
Saint Rosalia, Kunsthistorisches Museum, Vienna

== Bibliography ==
- Bertini, Giuseppe (1817). "Pietro Novelli". In Domenico Martuscelli (ed.). Biografia degli uomini illustri del regno di Napoli. Vol. 4. Naples: Nicola Gervasi.
- Gallo, Agostino (1830). Elogio storico di Pietro Novelli da Morreale in Sicilia pittore, architetto, ed incisori (3rd ed.). Palermo: Reale Stamperia.
- Bryan, Michael (1889). Walter Armstrong; Robert Edmund Graves (eds.). Dictionary of Painters and Engravers, Biographical and Critical. Vol. II L-Z. London: George Bell and Sons. p. 217.
- Stefano, Guido di (1989). Pietro Novelli il Monrealese. Palermo: Flaccovio.
- Greco Di Bianca, Antonina (1990). "Il Seicento in Sicilia: Pietro Novelli il Monrealese". Il Giornale dell'Arte. 8 (80).
- Finaldi, Gabriele (2006). "La "Resurrección de Lázaro" de Pietro Novelli, il Monrealese". Boletín del Museo del Prado. 24 (42): 24–30.
- "Novelli, Pietro [il Monrealese]". Artnet. Archived from the original on 14 February 2005.
- "Pietro Novelli". Getty Guide. J. Paul Getty Museum. Archived from the original on 2 March 2012.
- "Cain and Abel by Pietro Novelli". Web Gallery of Art.
