= Gevaert =

Gevaert is a Flemish surname. Notable people with the surname include:

- Agfa-Gevaert, Belgian imaging technologies company
  - Agfa-Gevaert Tournament, English golf tournament between 1963 and 1971
- François-Auguste Gevaert (1828–1908), Belgian composer
- Kim Gevaert (born 1978), Belgian sprinter
- Lieven Gevaert (1868–1935), Belgian industrialist

== See also ==
- 8700 Gevaert, asteroid
