= Angelo Tancredi =

Blessed Angelo Tancredi OFM

Religious
- Born: 1195; Rieti, Duchy of Spoleto, Holy Roman Empire
- Died: 13 February 1258
- Venerated in: Roman Catholic Church
- Feast: 13 February

The blessed Angelo Tancredi (died 1258) was a Roman Catholic monastic leader, one of the 12 early companions of Saint Francis of Assisi.

He was born in Rieti, where as a young armored knight he putatively met Francis, who putatively told him:

Lord Angelo, long time is it now since first you girt on your sword, and donned all your warlike armour. Now would it become you to gird you with a rough rope like me; in place of the sword to take the Cross of Christ, and for boots and spurs to shoe you with the dust and mire of the streets. Follow me, then, and I will make you a knight of Christ.

Loyally following Francis in his wanderings through Italy, Spain, and France, he putatively was present for the saint's sermon to the birds (Saint Francis Preaching to the Birds). He also putatively aided St Clare of Assisi in establishing her order.
