= Santa Maria del Rosario, Alcamo =

Church building in Alcamo, Italy

Santa Maria del Rosario
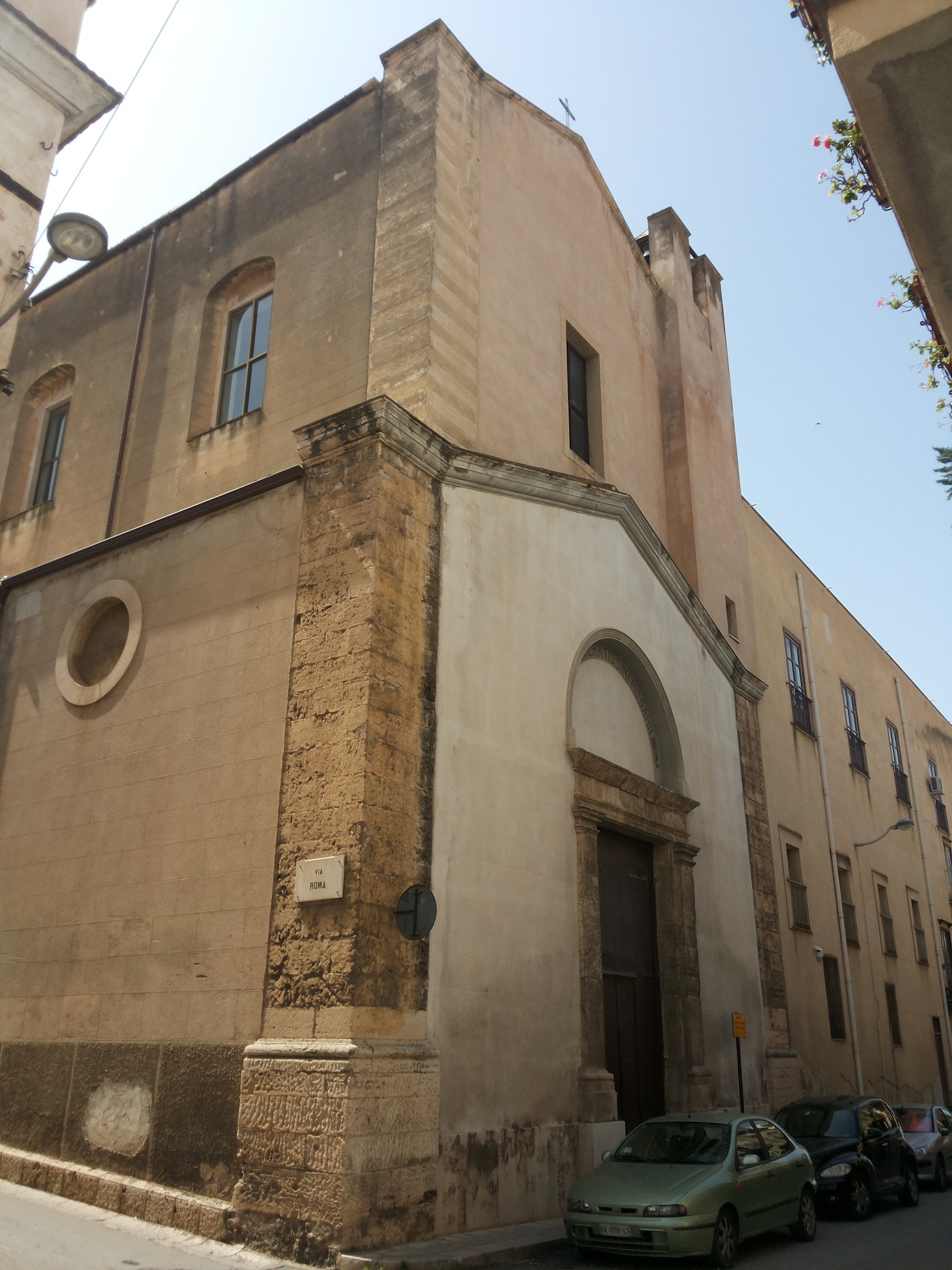
- The façade

Religion
- Affiliation: Dominican
- Province: province of Trapani
- Region: Sicily
- Rite: Catholic
- Patron: Our Lady of the Rosary

Location
- Location: Alcamo, province of Trapani, Italy
- Municipality: Alcamo
- State: Italy
- Interactive map of Santa Maria del Rosario
- Territory: Alcamo
- Coordinates: 37°58′55″N 12°57′51″E

Architecture
- Funded by: Dominican friars
- Groundbreaking: 1660

Santa Maria del Rosario ("Our Lady of the Rosary", also called San Domenico) is a Catholic church in Alcamo, in the province of Trapani.

== History ==
It was founded in 1660 with the adjoining friary (used for public offices and houses after 1866) by the Dominican Fathers.

Until that year they had resided in another friary next to Santa Maria della Stella, where in 1587 there were eight friars and needed an urgent restoration work. They moved to the town area where today there is the Church of the Rosary, and carried the fresco with the Madonna which is still kept in this Church.

In 1761 the church was rebuilt and enlarged a lot, and finally in 1947 became a parish dedicated to Our Lady of the Rosary.

== Works ==
The interior with a rectangular nave and nine chapels, keeps the following works which are of good artistic value:

- A cross, painted in the 15th century and placed on the ceiling
- an old painting of Saint Dominic, on the left side after the main entrance
- Saint Peter Martyr, a 17th-century painting; below it there is a wooden statue of Madonna del Ponte made by Giuseppe Ospedale; in the first left chapel
- Saint Vincent Ferrer a wooden statue, probably made in the 18th century; second left chapel
- Our Lady of the Rosary (Madonna del Rosario) with the Mysteries, a painting by Vito Carrera in 1603; on the secondary door
- Saint Anthony of Padua a painting by Mario Giambona (1713), coming from the ex church of Itria; third left chapel
- Our Lady of Sorrows, on the wall there is a marble Bas-relief by the school of Gagini, representing Dormitio Virginis; fourth left chapel

In the apse: a beautiful altar with Our Lady of the Rosary and three wooden statues of Madonna and Child, Saint Dominic and Saint Rose of Lima

- An old painting of Saint Catherine of Siena: on the right side, past the main entrance
- A Dominican saint kneeling before Madonna and Child, made by Bernardo Rizzuti Pauletti from Corleone (1718) in the second room
- Saint Dominic, an old painting probably made in the 18th century; below it there is a wooden statue of Saint Expeditus by Domenico Messina; first right chapel
- Santa Maria della Stella (1464), a fresco originally from the eponymous church, Santa Maria della Stella, Alcamo, attributed to Tommaso De Vigilia; although damaged and faded due to the passage of time, it still has the original expressive force. In the second right chapel
- The Sacred Heart of Jesus, a wooden statue; third right chapel
- Elegant altar with a painting of saint Dominic by an unknown author, on the pillars there are 15 oval paintings representing the 15 mysteries of the Rosary realized by Carlo Brunetti in 1759 on behalf of the Company of the Rosary; fourth right chapel.
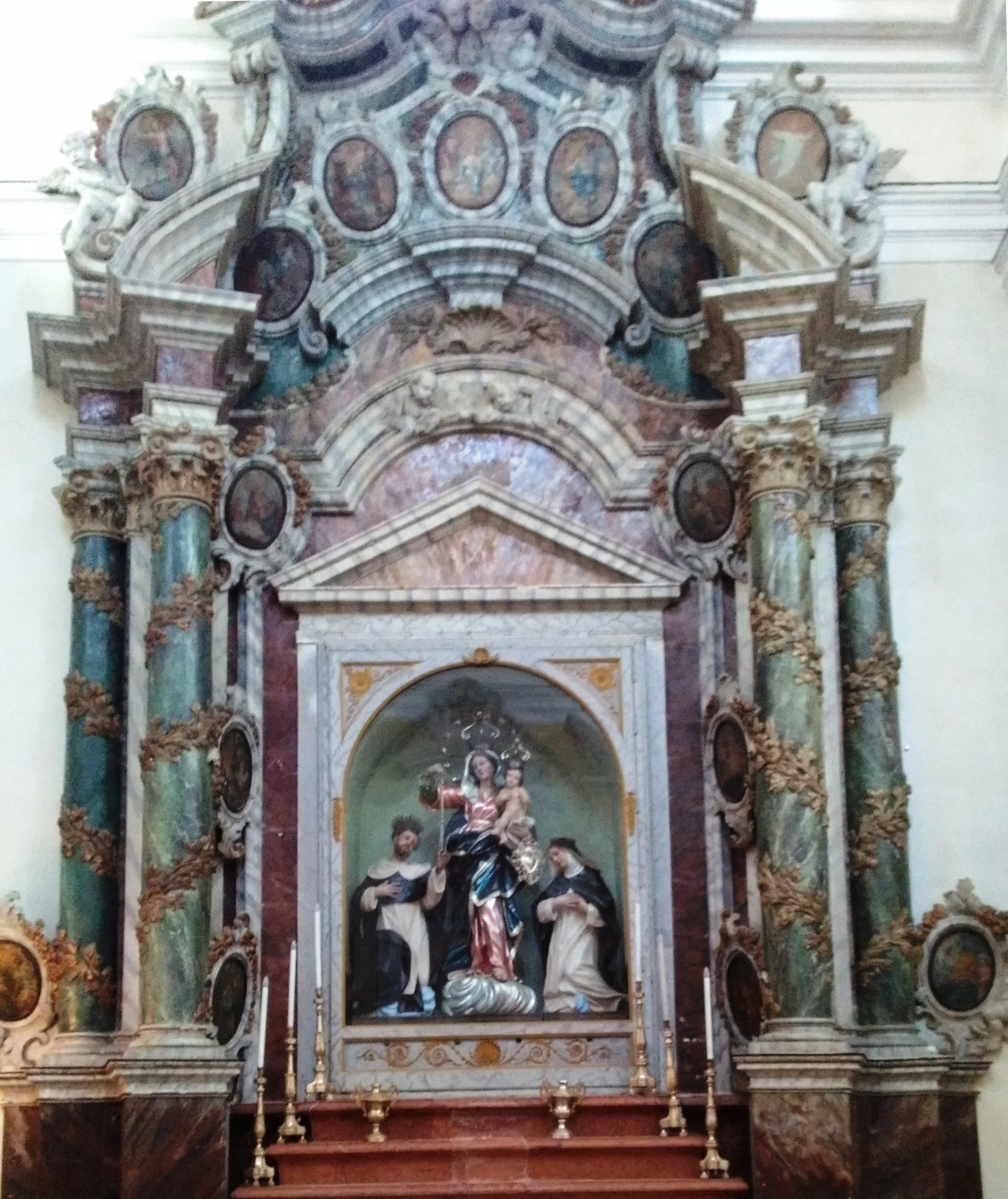
Our Lady of the Rosary with Saint Dominic and Saint Rose of Lima

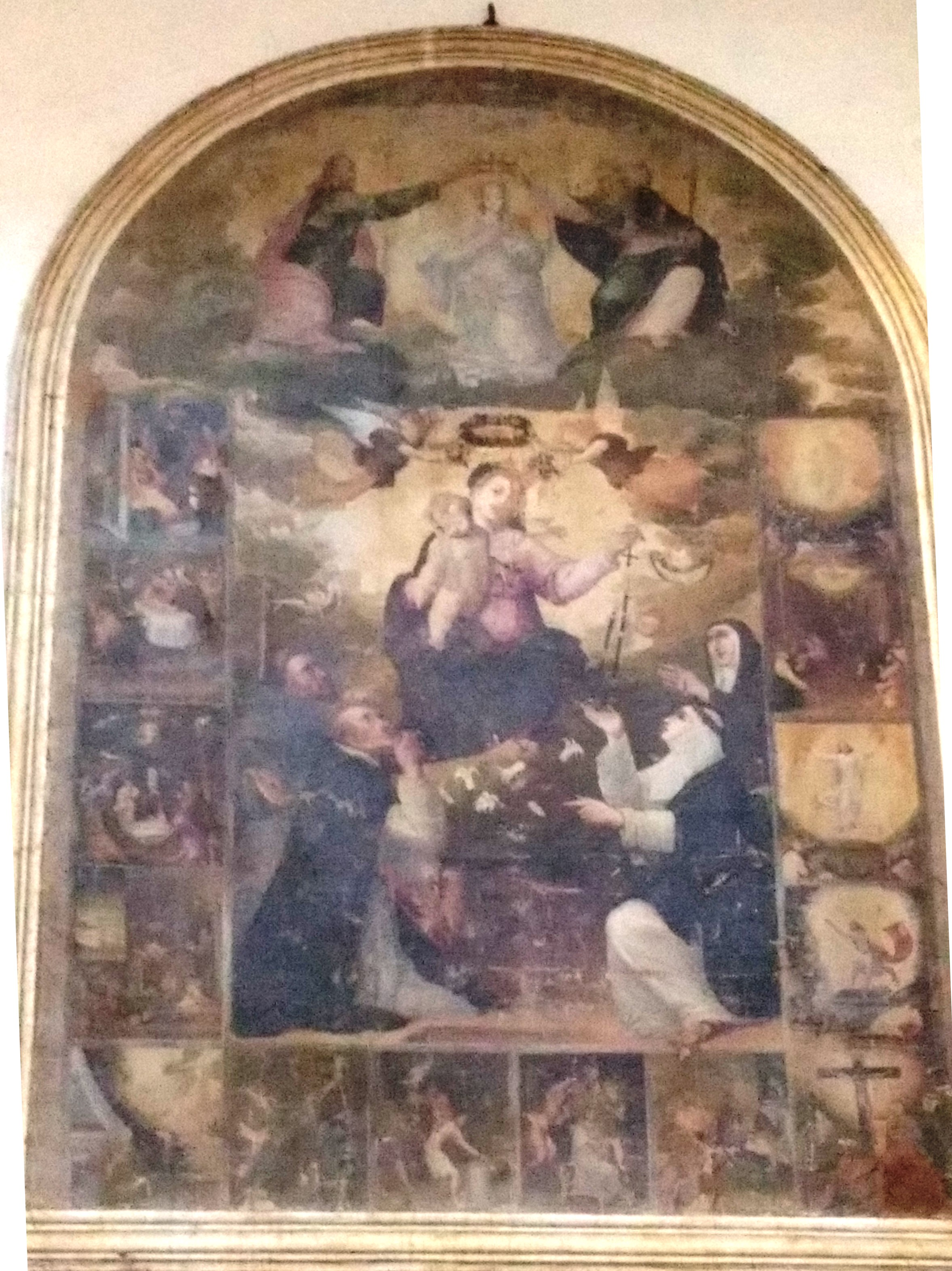
Our Lady of the Rosary with the Mysteries

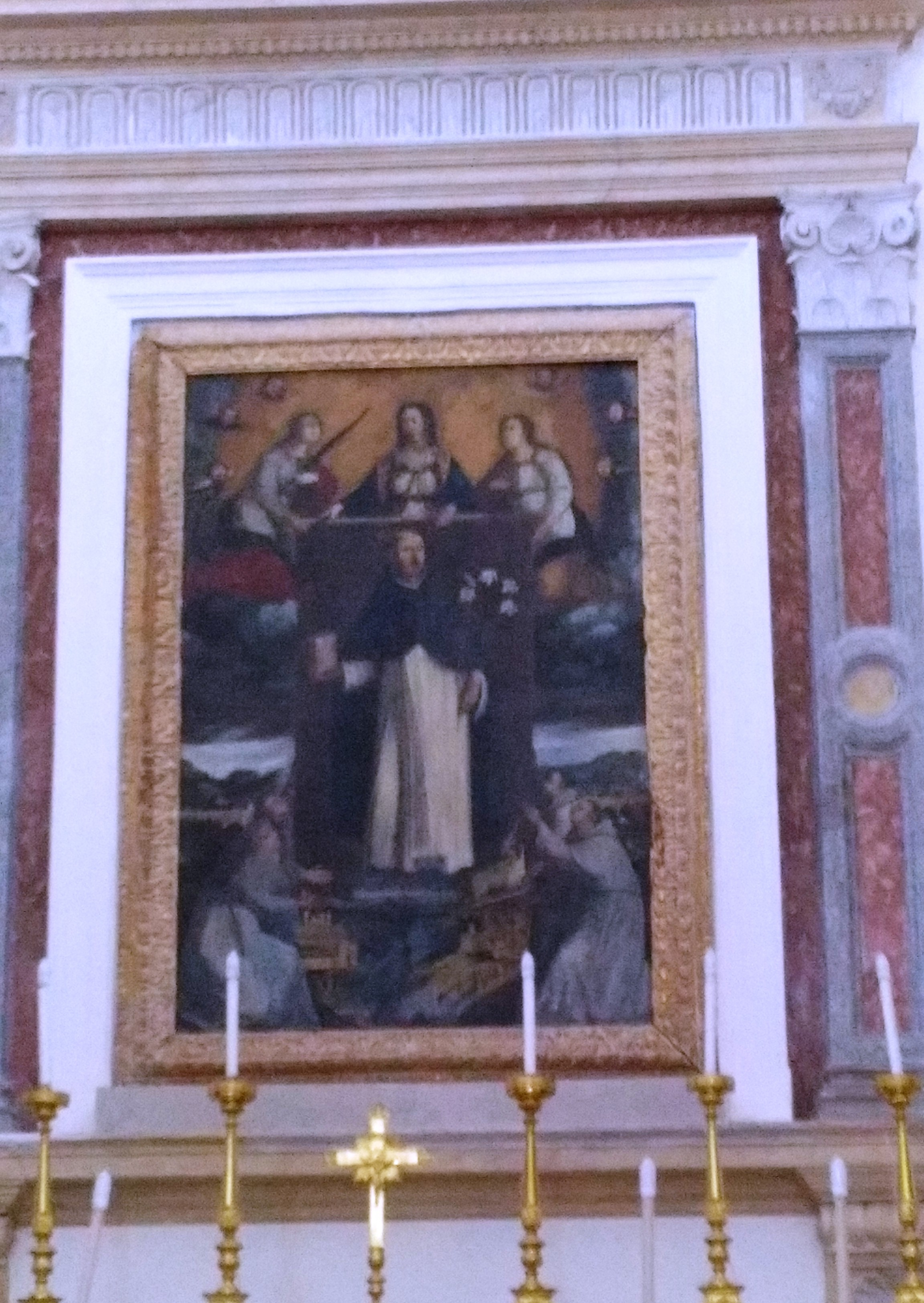
Saint Dominic

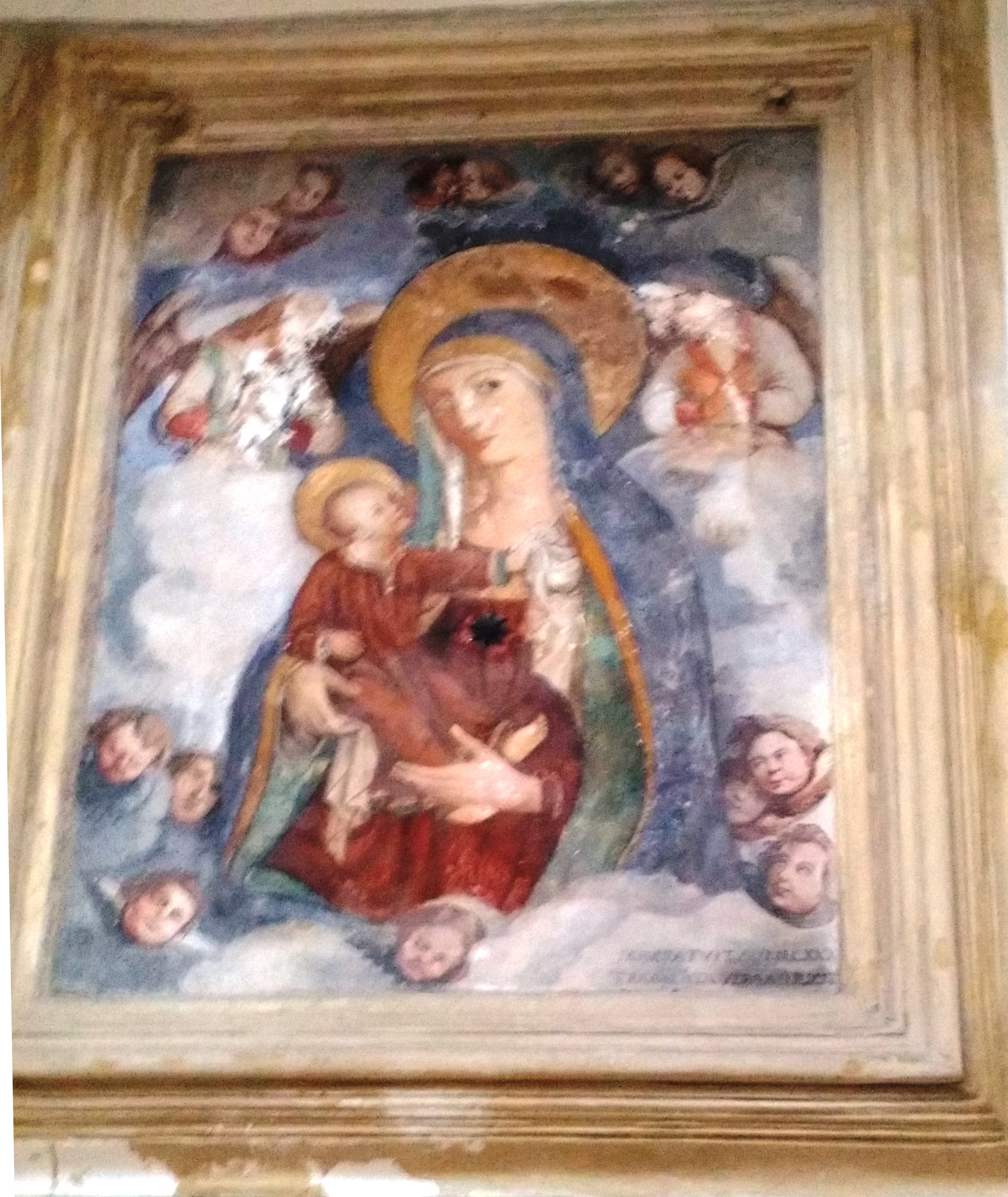
Our Lady of the Star

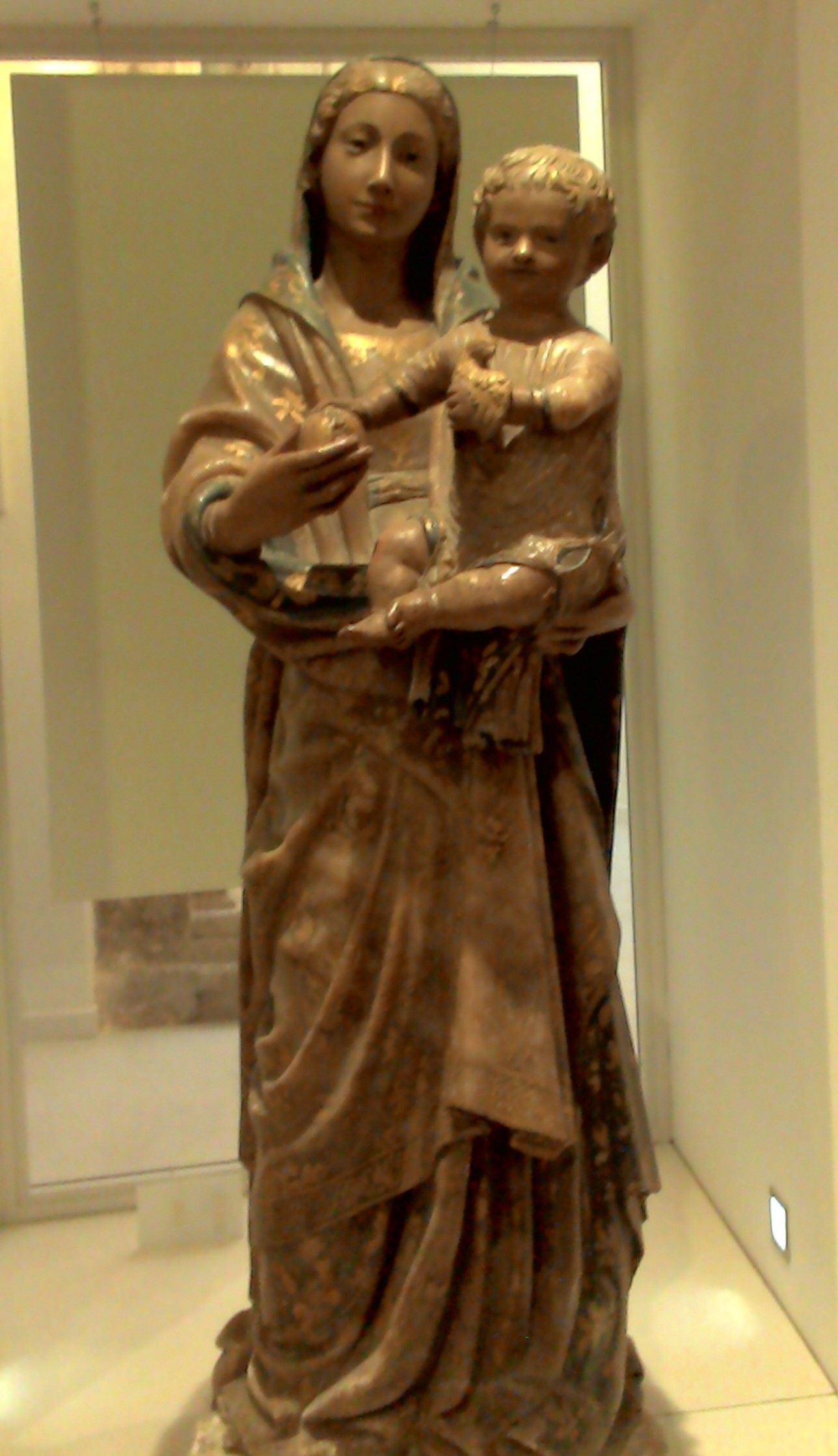
Our Lady of Providence

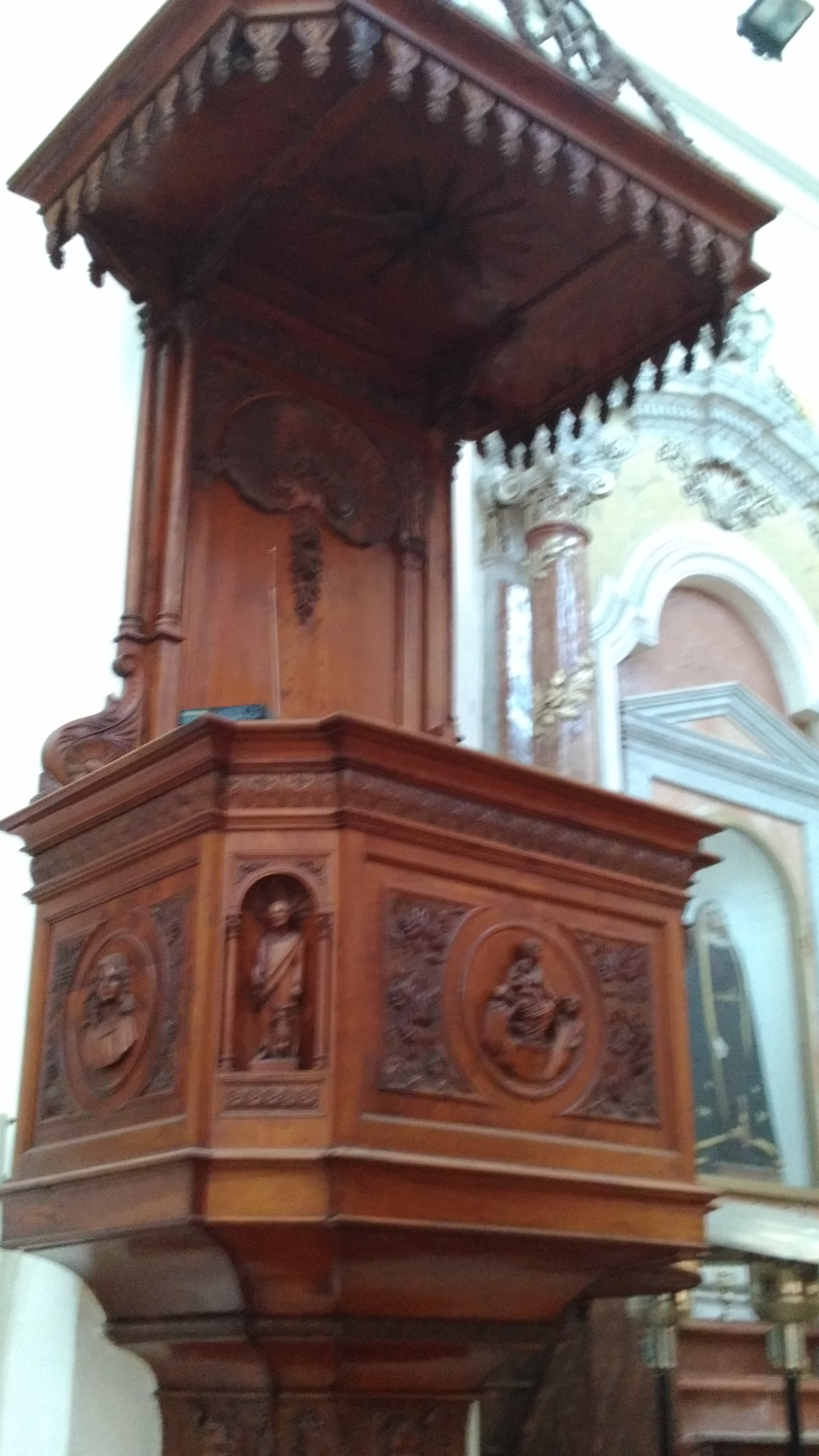
The wooden pulpit

Inside the sacristy there was an alabaster statue of the Virgin and Child, called Madonna della Provvidenza, dating back to the 15th century and attributed to Pietro de Bonitate (today kept in the Sacred Art Museum in the Mother Church), a painting representing the miracle of saint Vincenzo Ferreri made by Giuseppe Renda in 1793, and another representing saint Angela Merici, made in 1905 by Francesco Alesi.

== See also ==
- Alcamo
- Catholic Church in Italy
- Domenicani
- San Domenico

== Bibliography ==
- Calia, Roberto; Craparo, Enzo; Baldassano Cataldo, Erina (1991). Itinerari in Sicilia – La Bella Alcamo – Religiosità e Tradizioni. Trapani: Cartograf. pp. 56–57.
- Vitella, Maurizio (2011). Il Museo d'Arte Sacra della Basilica Santa Maria Assunta di Alcamo. Trapani: il pozzo di giacobbe. ISBN 978-88-6124-306-4.
- "ex chiesa parrocchiale".
- "la storia della prima Chiesa madre".
- Cataldo, Carlo (1982). Guida storico-artistica dei beni culturali di Alcamo-Calatafimi-Castellammare Golfo. Alcamo: Sarograf. pp. 76–79.
- Cataldo, Carlo (2001). La conchiglia di S.Giacom. Alcamo: Campo. p. 107.
