= Santa Maria della Stella, Alcamo =

Historical church in Alcamo, Italy

Santa Maria della Stella
- Chiesa di Santa Maria della Stella (Italian)
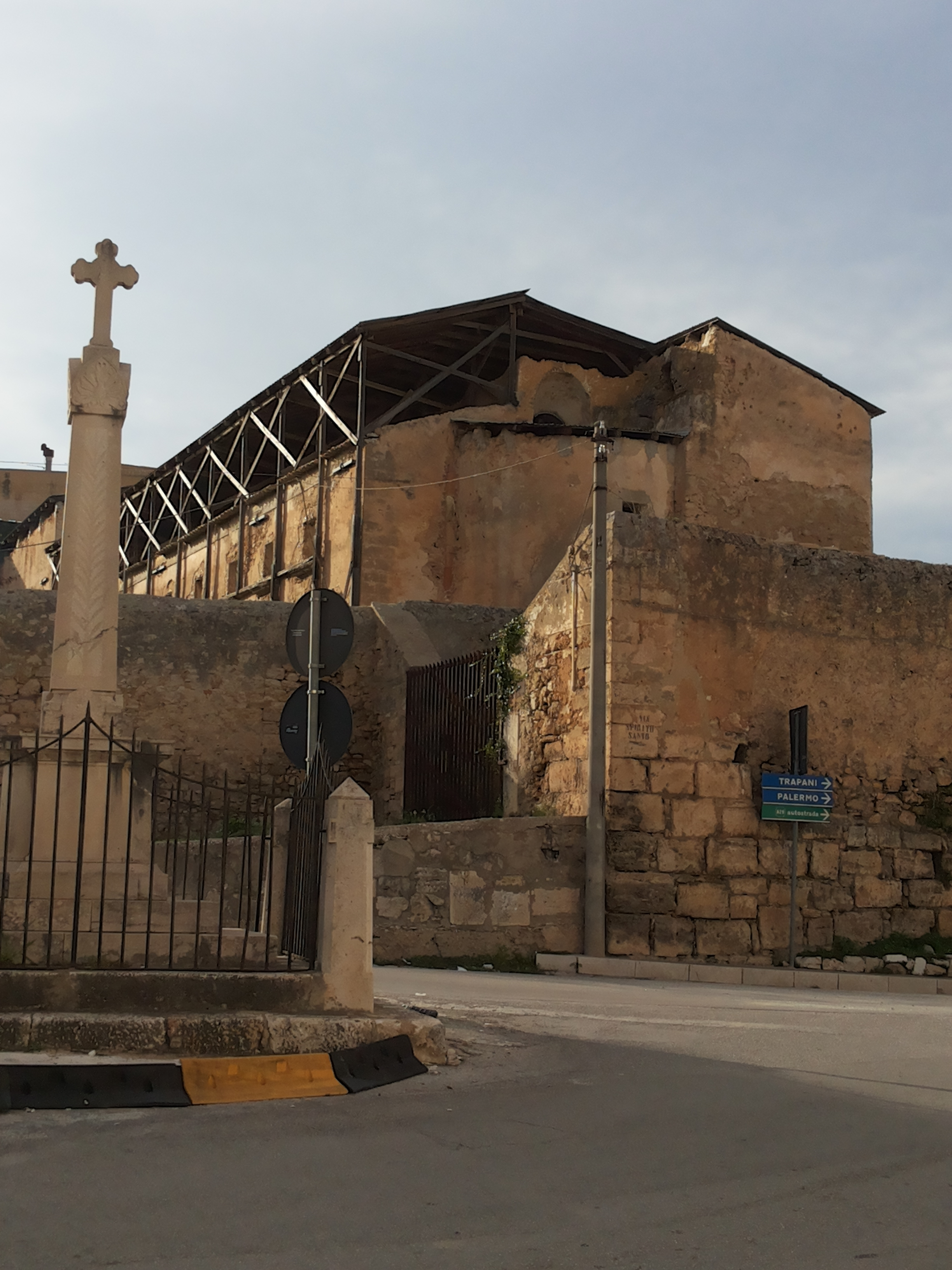
- External view of the church

Religion
- Affiliation: Christian
- Province: Trapani
- Region: Sicily
- Patron: Santa Maria della Stella

Location
- Location: Alcamo, Trapani, Italy
- State: Italy
- Interactive map of Santa Maria della Stella
- Territory: Alcamo
- Coordinates: 37°59′04″N 12°57′50″E

Architecture
- Completed: before 1130

Santa Maria della Stella (Italian for "Holy Mary of the Star", originally Santa Maria della Misericordia) is a former church located in Alcamo, in the province of Trapani, Sicily, southern Italy.

== History ==
According to a 17th-century inscription on the right lower corner of the fresco of Our Lady of the Star (today hosted inside the Church of Our Lady of the Rosary), the present church was founded before 1130, when the town of Alcamo was expanding towards the north.

In 1221 the church was enlarged by the ancestors of the families De Ballis, Comes, Gentilis and Maurici. It was then designated as the mother church of Alcamo in May 1313 by the bishop of Mazara Gotofredo Roncione, on Ascension Day.

Later the town centre moved south, and in 1332 construction began on the new mother church dedicated to Our Lady of the Assumption, which was completed in 1402.

In the 15th century the families Comes and Gentiles assigned the land adjoining the church to the Dominican friars in order to build a convent, with a garden and a vegetable garden. In 1427 Father Geremia, a Dominican friar, became Pope and came to Alcamo to visit convents and establish a general reform.

In 1604 the confraternity of the Rosary was incorporated by the Dominicans and they decided to celebrate the feast in honour of Our Lady of the Rosary at their own expense. Having noticed the distance separating the convent from the town centre, the friars decided to build a new convent and a new church dedicated to Our Lady of the Rosary on the present premises in the Via Giovanni Amendola, abandoning the old convent in 1660. So in 1661 they moved the image of Our Lady of the Star, together with the wall, to the church of Our Lady of the Rosary.

In 1706 the Jesuits asked the town jurymen for the concession of the Dominicans' former convent (called "the old one" and reduced to a deplorable state of abandon) in order to establish a house for spiritual retreat where they could practice "Saint Ignatius of Loyola's exercises". After its restoration, the former convent could host 40 people and since then has been called "the Retreat" (in Italian: "Il Ritiro") by the inhabitants of Alcamo.

== Features ==
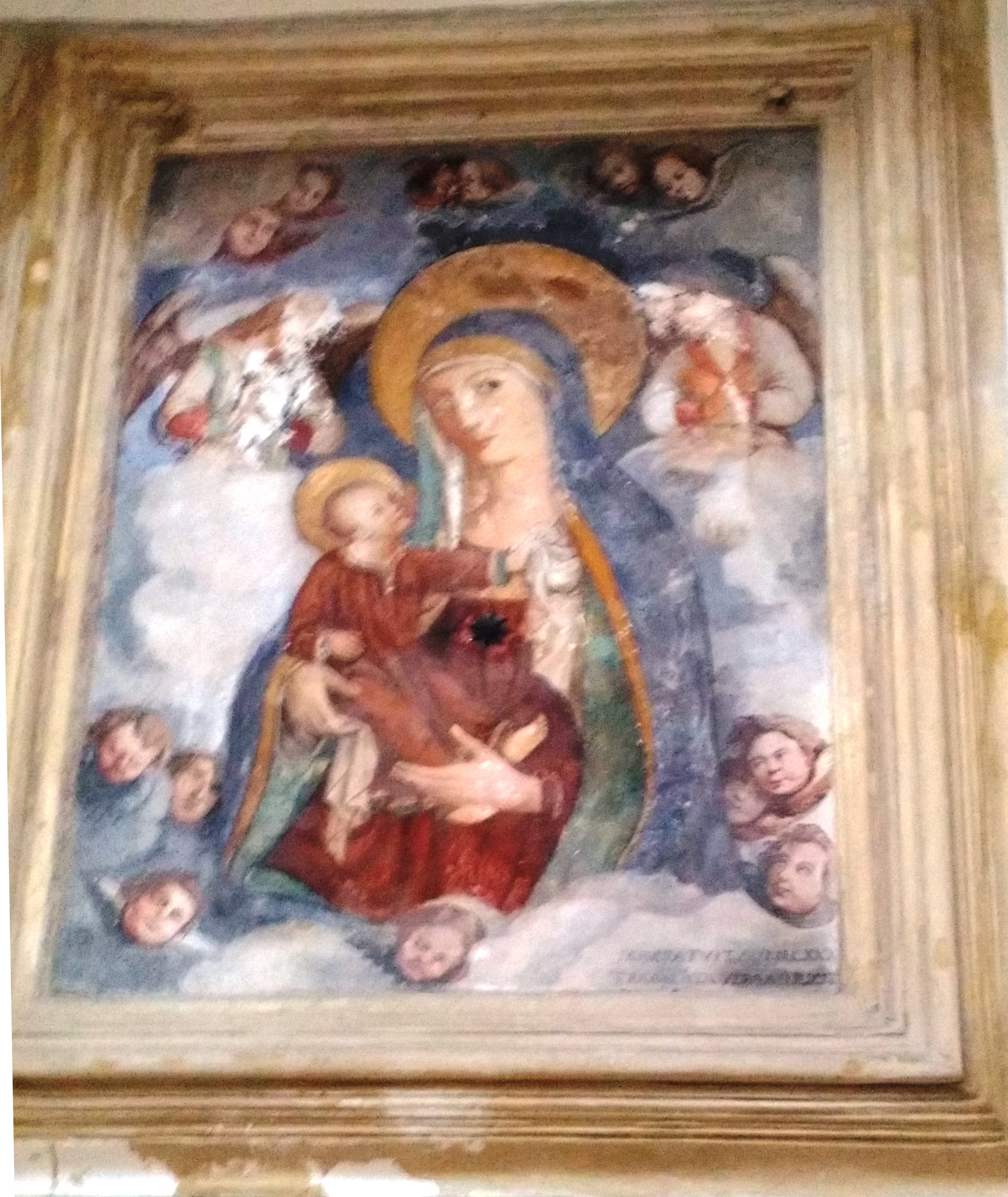
Santa Maria della Stella

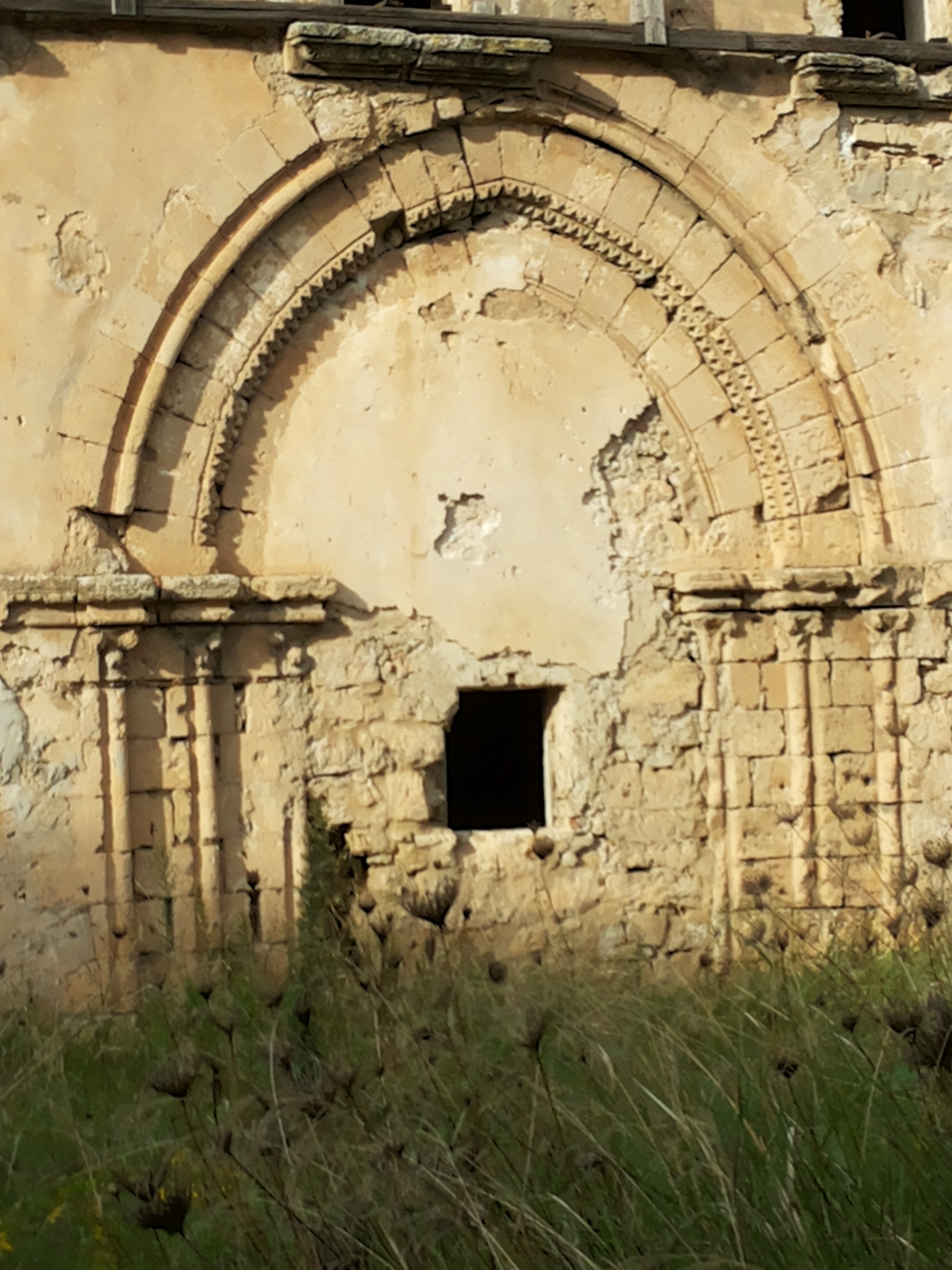
The Gothic portal in the Church of Our Lady of the Star.

There is only a portal in travertinoid calcarenite in trecento gothic-chiaramontan style of this old building. According to a notarial act dated 1582, the church portal was originally realized at the beginning of the 14th century. Later the church passed to the Diana family who replaced the old portal with the present one; this explains the presence of the Dianas' coat of arms on the top of one of the capitals on the portal's sides. Hence the present portal would date back to the second half of the 14th century and the first years of the 15th century.

The painting of Our Lady of the Star, a fresco which was held inside, is assigned to Tommaso De Vigilia by Gioacchino Di Marzo and according to the same historian would date back to 1464. It represents Our Lady with the Child Jesus in her arms and moving the veil covering her bosom with his hand. The angels surrounding them were added later on; the image shows the inscription "painted in 1130" on the right bottom. It is severely damaged, faded and with a lacking eye.

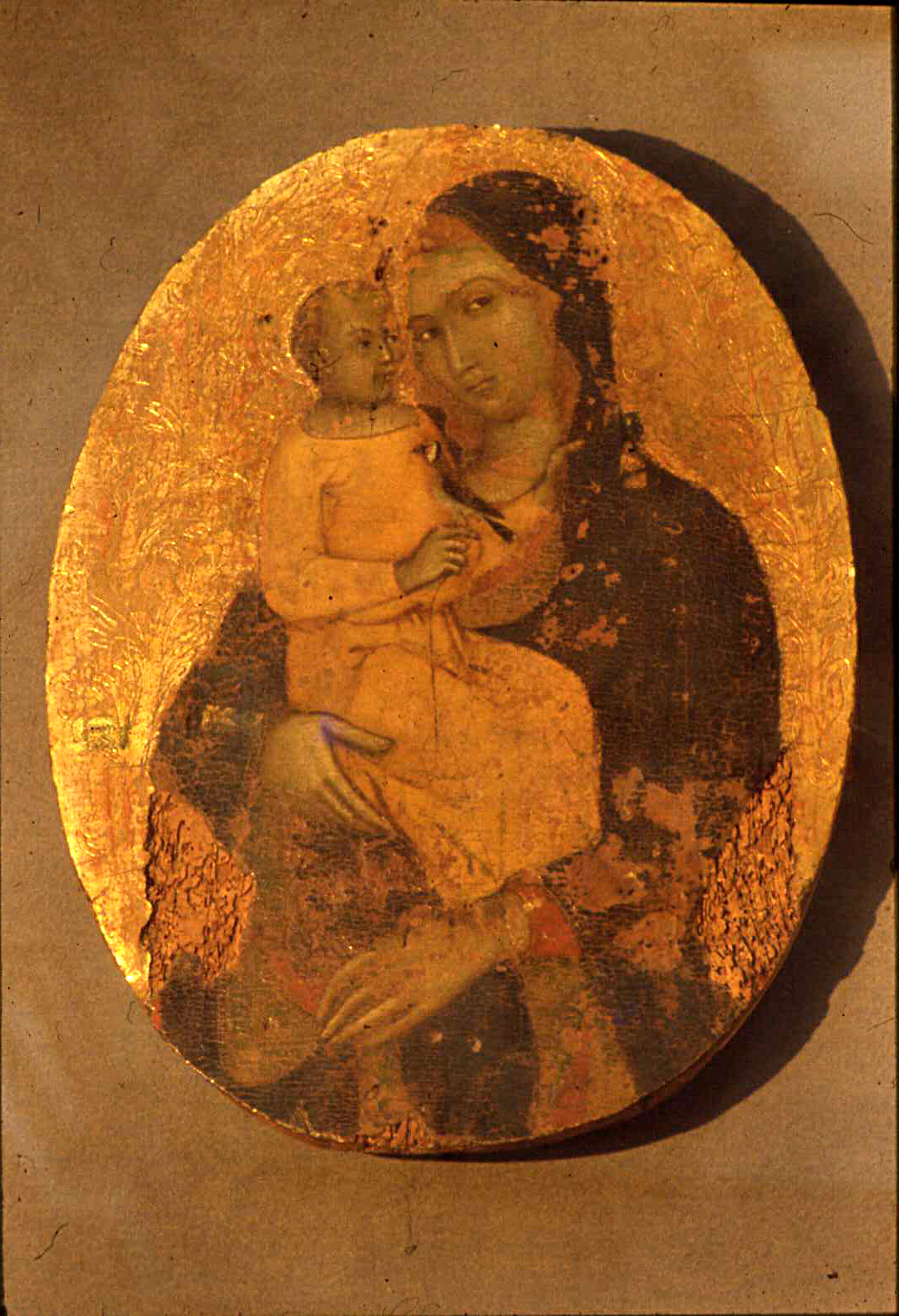
The painting of Madonna of Honey, kept inside the church of Saints Paul and Barthomew.

Inside the church there was also the painting of Madonna of Honey (made in 1300) that was moved to the church of Saints Paul and Bartholomew. This painting is assigned to Barnaba of Modena and is considered the oldest painting in Alcamo.

== Sources ==
- Regina, Vincenzo (1972). Profilo storico di Alcamo e sue opere d'arte dalle origini al secolo XV. Alcamo: Edizioni Accademia di Studi "Cielo d'Alcamo".
