= Sant'Anna, Palermo =

There are two churches in Palermo dedicated to Saint Anne:

- Sant'Anna la Misericordia located in the quarter of Kalsa
- Sant'Anna al Capo located in the quarter of Seralcadi, near the Mercato del Capo
