= Oratory of Rosario di San Domenico =

Baroque oratory in Palermo, Italy

Oratory of the Rosary of Saint Dominic
- Oratorio del Rosario di San Domenico (in Italian)
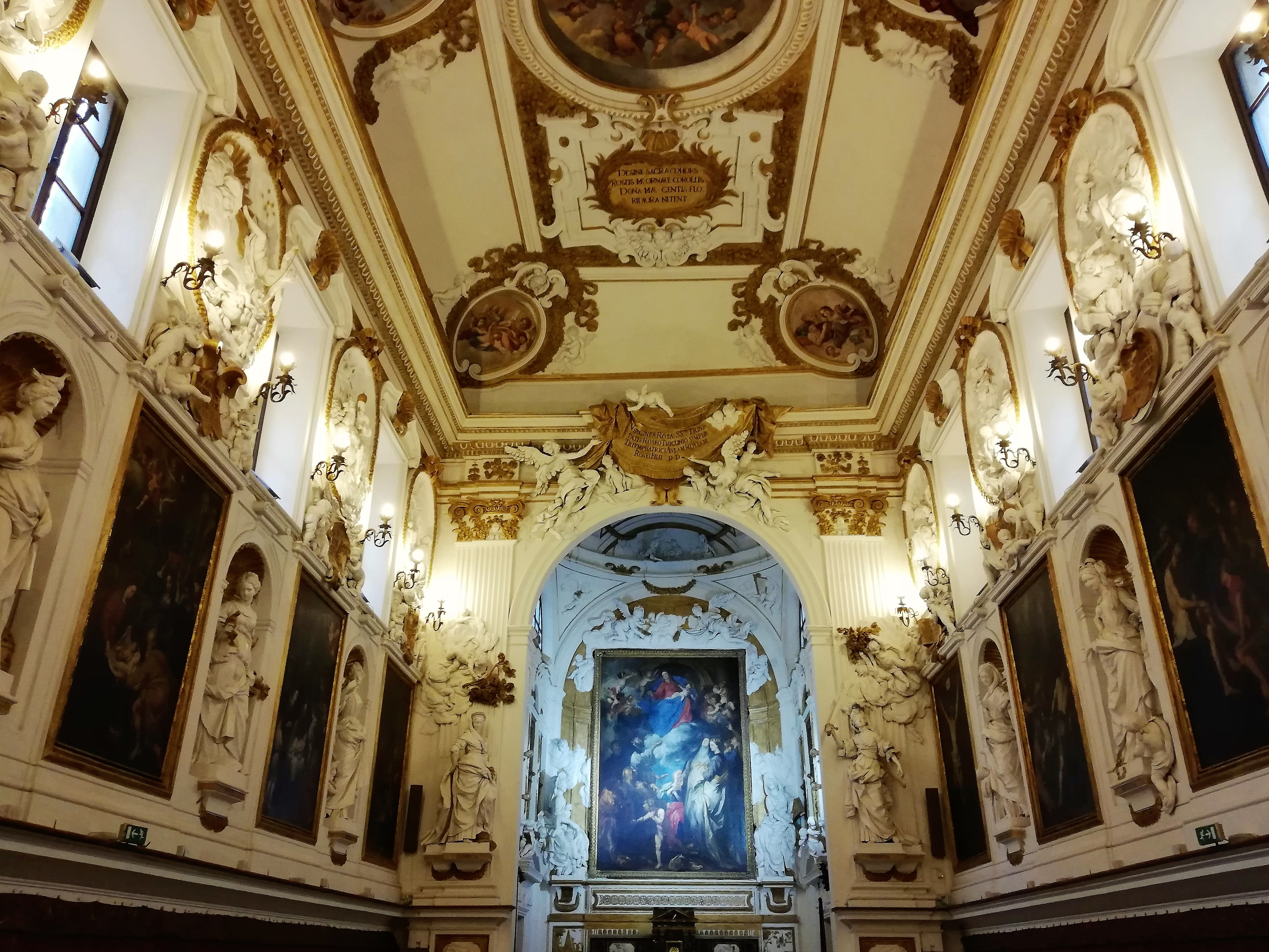
- Interior of the oratory. Stucco decoration is by Giacomo Serpotta. Main altarpiece Madonna of the Rosary with saints (1627) by Anton van Dyck.

Religion
- Affiliation: Roman Catholic
- Province: Archdiocese of Palermo
- Rite: Roman Rite

Location
- Location: Palermo, Italy
- Interactive map of Oratory of the Rosary of Saint Dominic
- Coordinates: 38°07′10.52″N 13°21′50.16″E

Architecture
- Style: Sicilian Baroque
- Groundbreaking: 1574

The Oratory of the Rosary of Saint Dominic (Italian: Oratorio del Rosario di San Domenico) is a Baroque oratory of Palermo. It is located near the Church of Saint Dominic, in the quarter of the Loggia, within the historic centre of Palermo.

The oratory was founded in 1574. In the early 18th century Giacomo Serpotta realized a sumptuous stucco decoration. Moreover, the oratory is decorated with several paintings of important artists like Matthias Stom; Guglielmo Borremans; Geronimo Gerardi (a Nativity); Pietro Novelli; Valerio Castello; and Luca Giordano.

The most prominent painting is the main altarpiece by Anthony van Dyck, depicting the Madonna of the Rosary with the saints Dominic, Catherine of Siena, Vincent Ferrer, Olivia, Nympha, Agatha, Christina and Rosalia. The painting was commissioned to Van Dyck during the period of the 1624 plague.

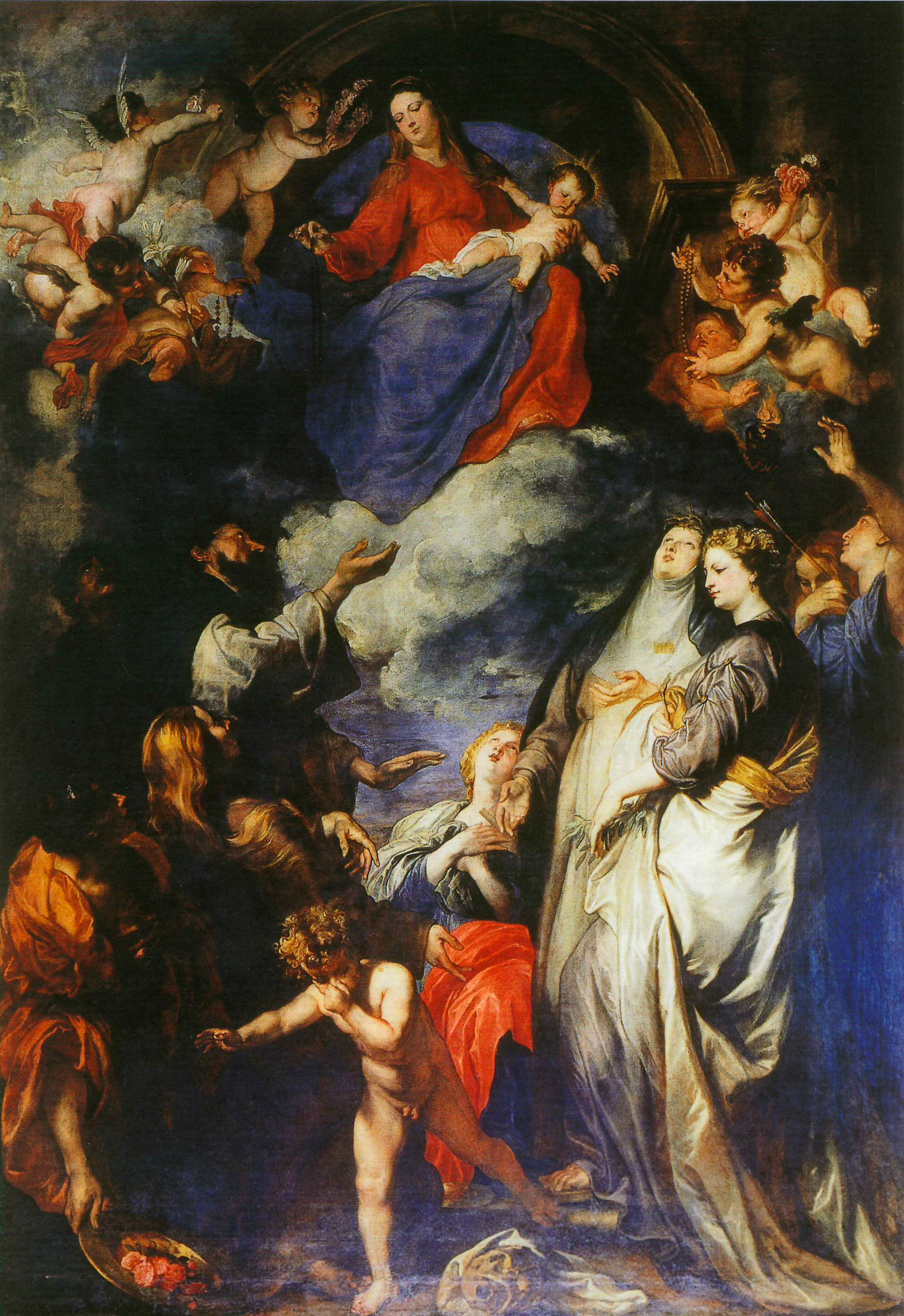
Anton van Dyck, Madonna of the Rosary with saints
