= Museo regionale Agostino Pepoli =

Museum in Trapani, Sicily, Italy

Coordinates: 38°01′08″N 12°32′32″E

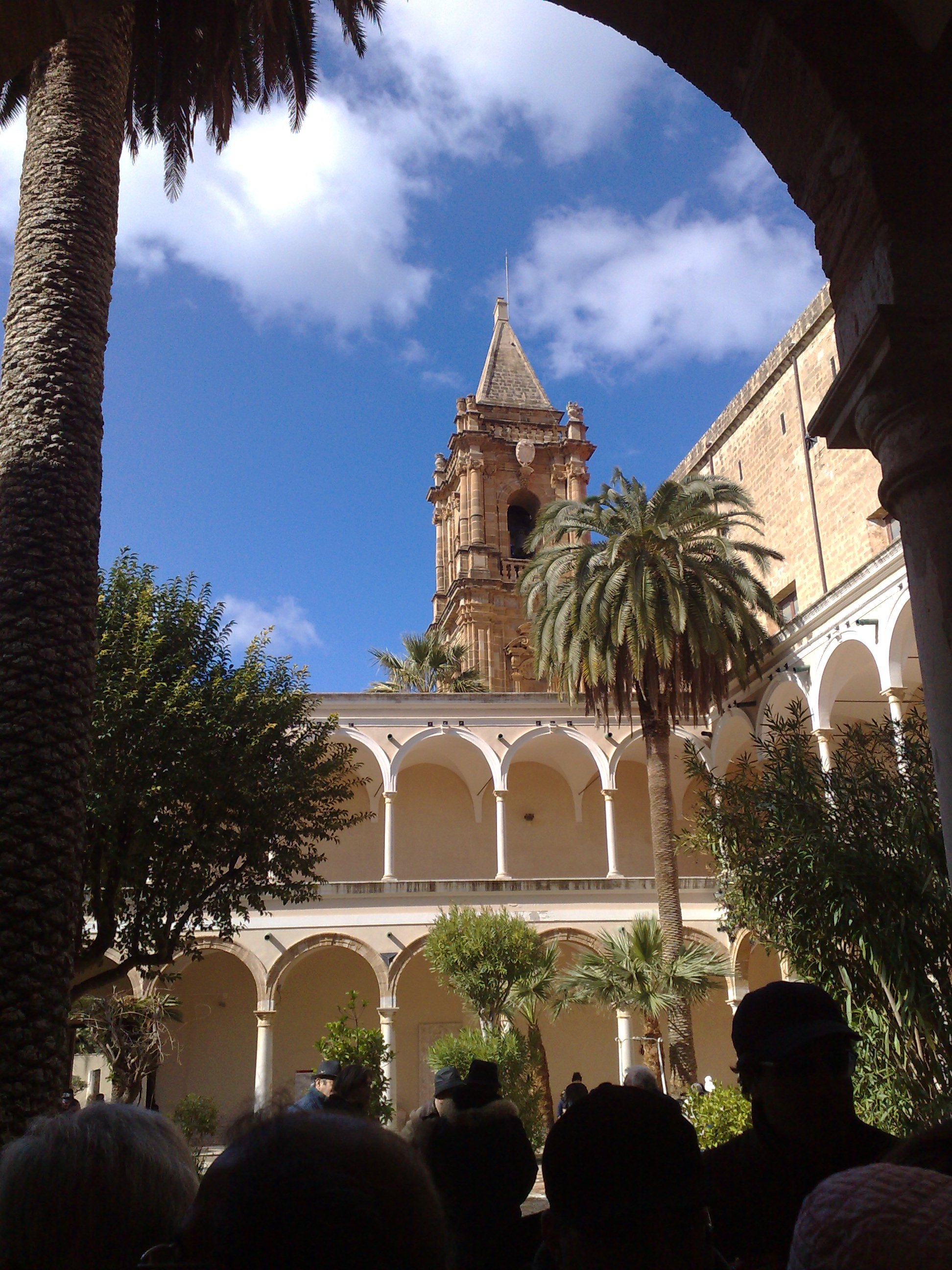

The Museo regionale Agostino Pepoli is an art, archaeology and local history museum in Trapani. It is one of the most important museums in Sicily.

Established in 1906–1908 as the civic museum by count Agostino Pepoli and initially based on the private collection of count Sieri Pepoli and Neapolitan paintings donated by general Giovanbattista Fardella, it is based in a former 14th century Carmelite monastery next to the Basilica-santuario di Maria Santissima Annunziata. In 1921 it acquired count Francesco Hernandez di Erice's collection of cribs, ceramics and archaeological objects

In 1925 it became the Regio museo, after the Second World War it became a national museum and finally in 1977 (when responsibility for cultural assets was devolved to the Italian regions) it was again renamed, this time the museum of the Sicilian Region. In the meantime its displays had been redesigned in the 1960s by the architect Franco Minissi, who for his work won the 1969 IN.ARCH., a regional prize.

In 2010 it was renamed the Museo Interdisciplinare Regionale Agostino Pepoli. It is also the museum with oversight of the Museo del Satiro danzante in Mazara del Vallo, the Tonnara di Favignana in Favignana and the Salt Museum in Nubia.

== Sections ==
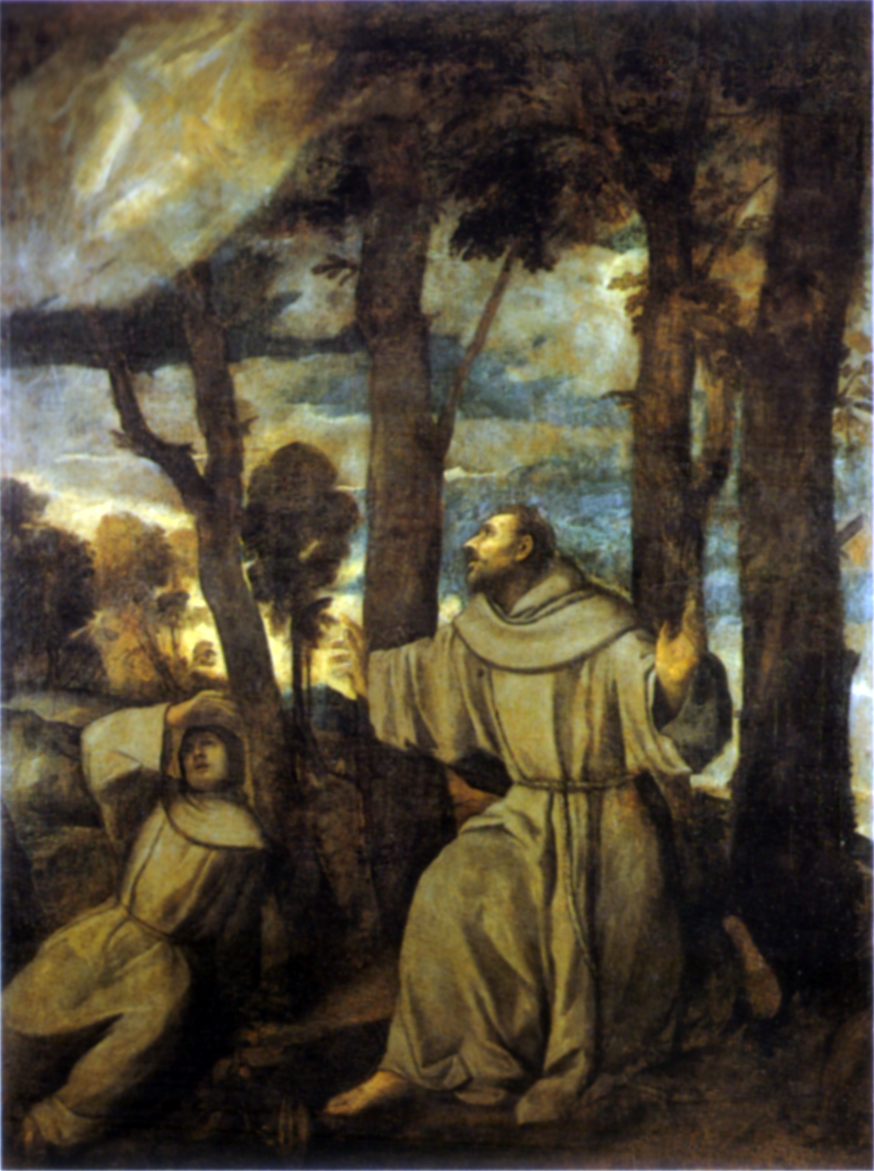
Titian, St Francis Receiving the Stigmata

It is subdivided into five main sections:

- works in marble and stone
- paintings
- industrial arts
- Renaissance sculpture
- Risorgimento memorabilia

== Collection ==
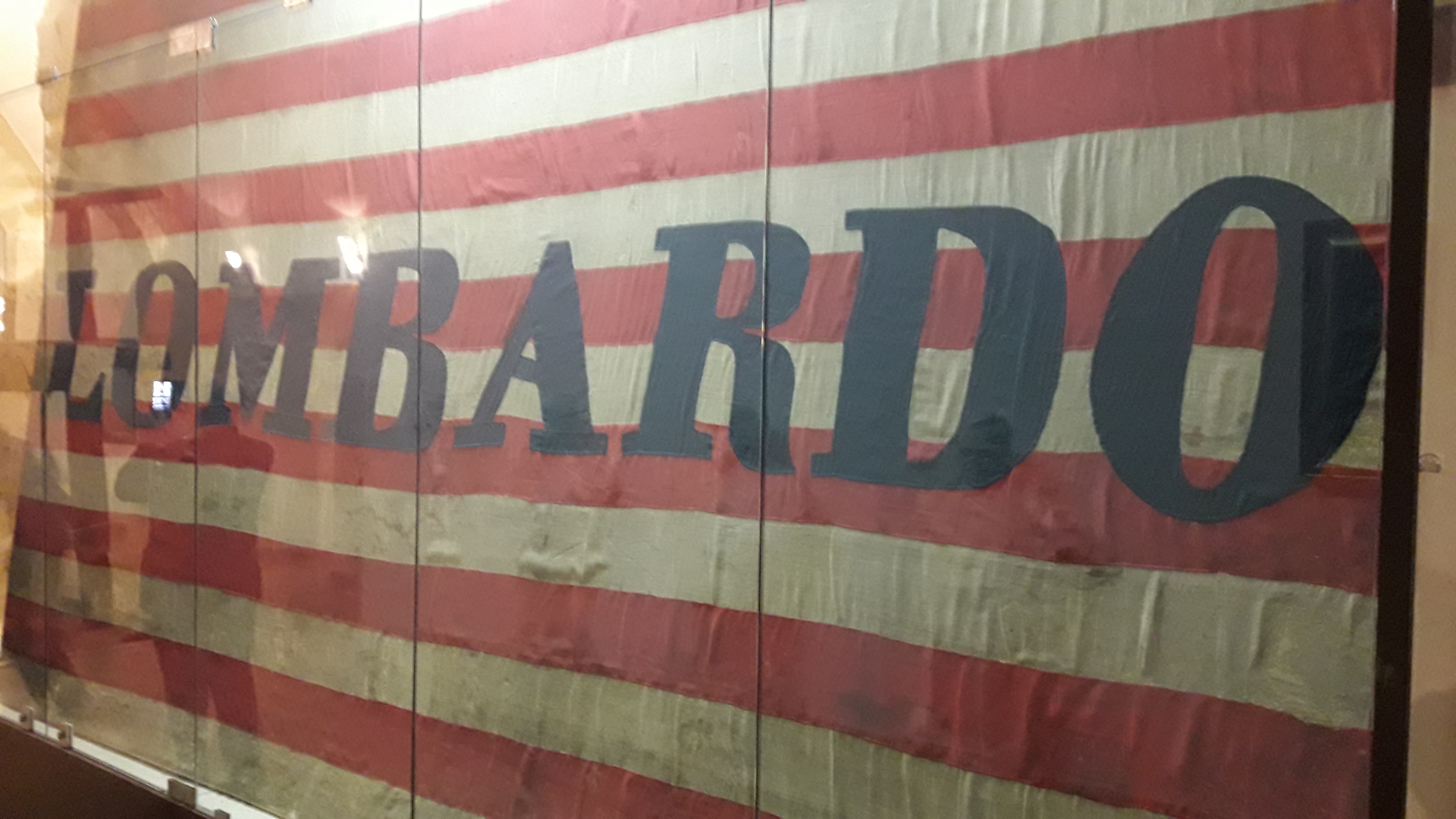
The ensign of the Lombardo.

The museum houses a large collection of paintings, cribs, sculpture and decorative arts, including works by Antonello Gagini and in coral and silver. The paintings include works by Titian (Saint Francis Receiving the Stigmata) and Giacomo Balla (a portrait of Nunzio Nasi), a 15th-century Valencian Madonna and Child with Angels, a 1380 Pietà by Roberto d'Oderisio and a St Andrew by the Flemish artist Geronimo Gerardi. It also includes the "Tesoro della Madonna", product of several donations to the Madonna di Trapani. The collection includes archaeological remains from the province (in 2009 Edipuglia published a catalogue of the Museum's archaeological collections) and historical relics of the Risorgimento era from Trapani, including a Bourbon-era guillotine and the ensign of the Lombardo, which brought Garibaldi and "The Thousand" to Sicily.

== Exhibitions ==
- 1986 - "L'arte del corallo in Sicilia", curated by Maria Concetta Di Natale
- 1989 - "Ori e argenti di Sicilia", curated by Maria Concetta Di Natale
- 2008 - "Caravaggio: L'immagine del divino", with 14 works by the artist

== Gallery ==
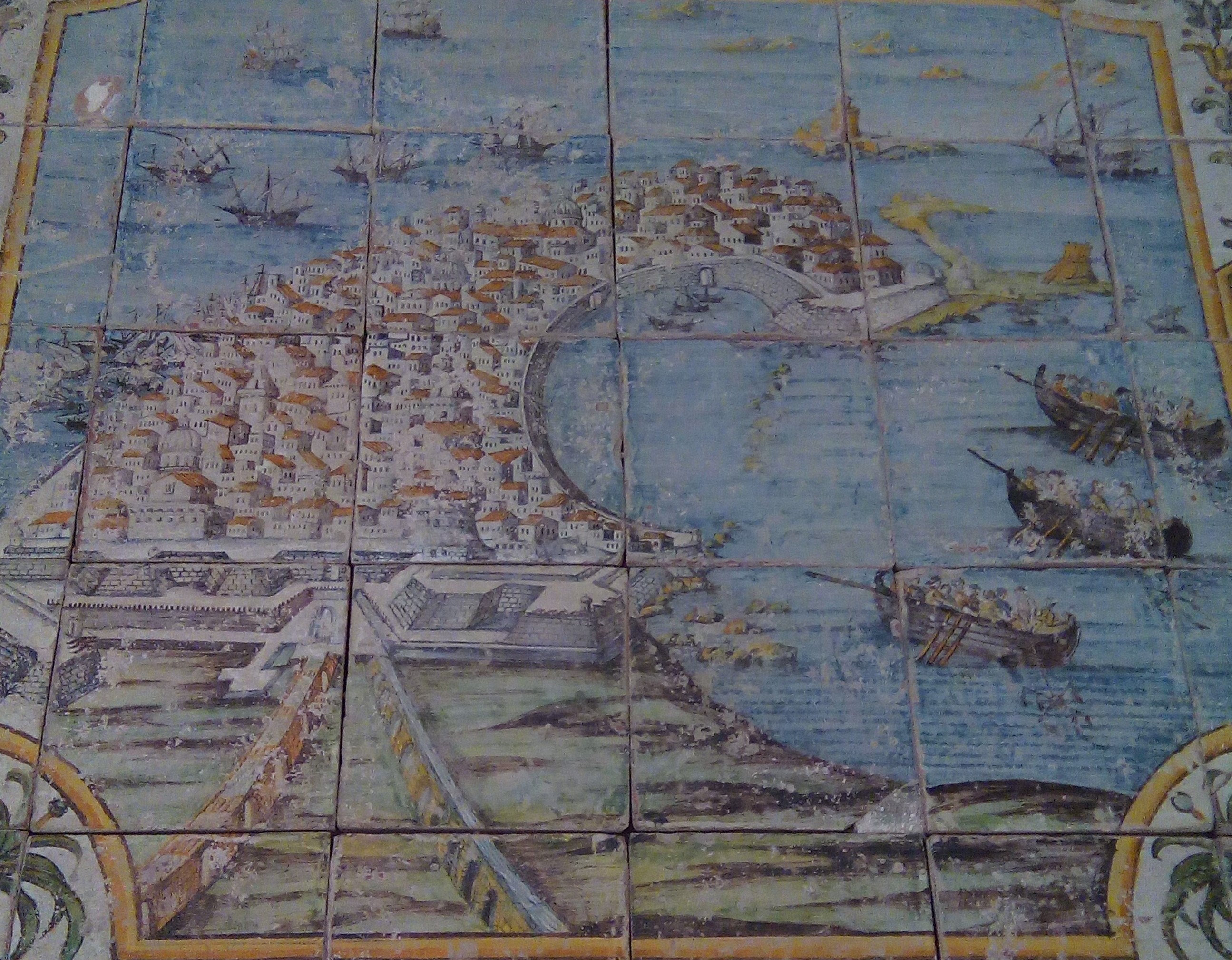
Maiolica flooring showing a historic map of Trapani

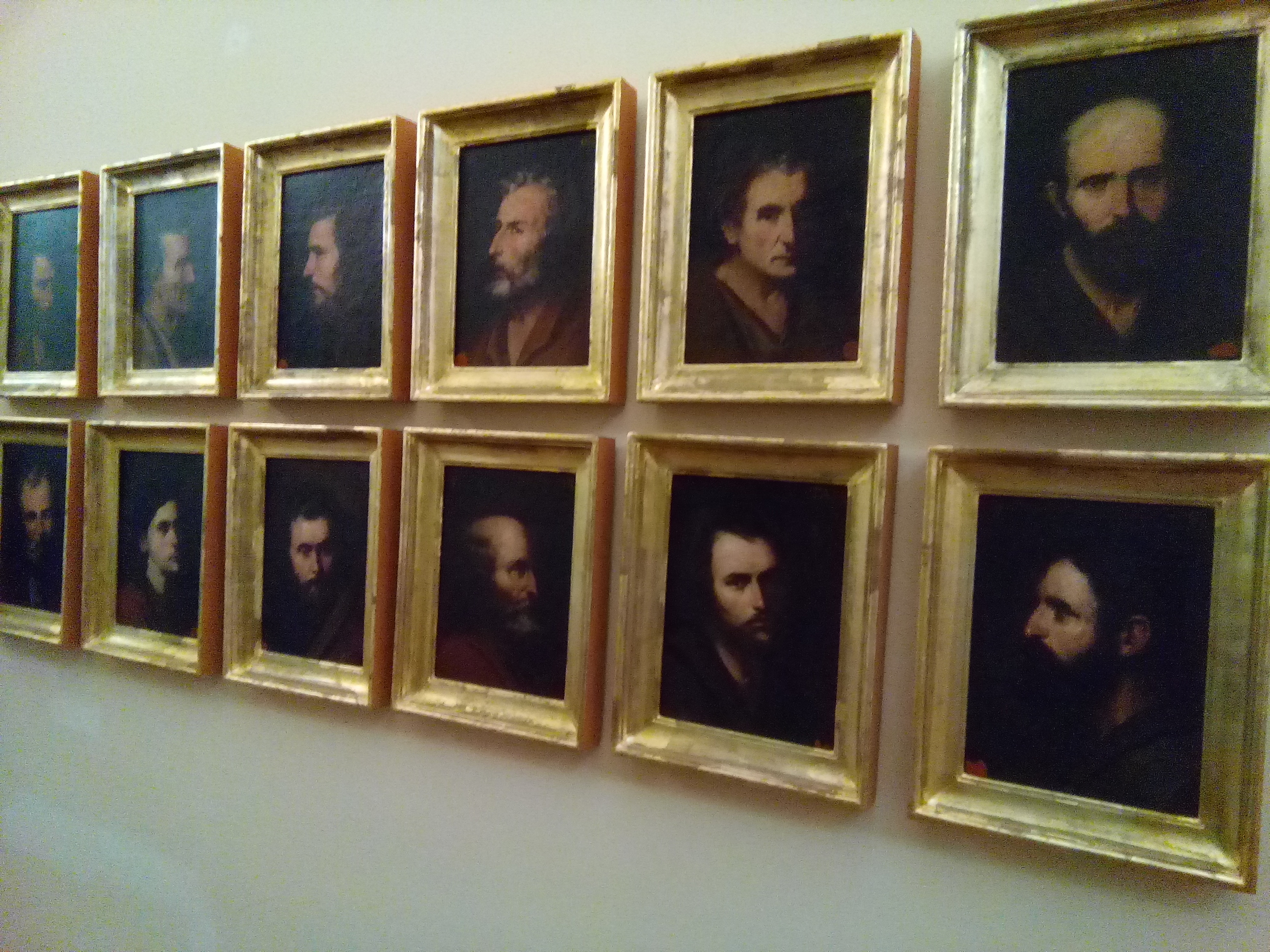
Twelve Apostles by Guilliam Walsgart

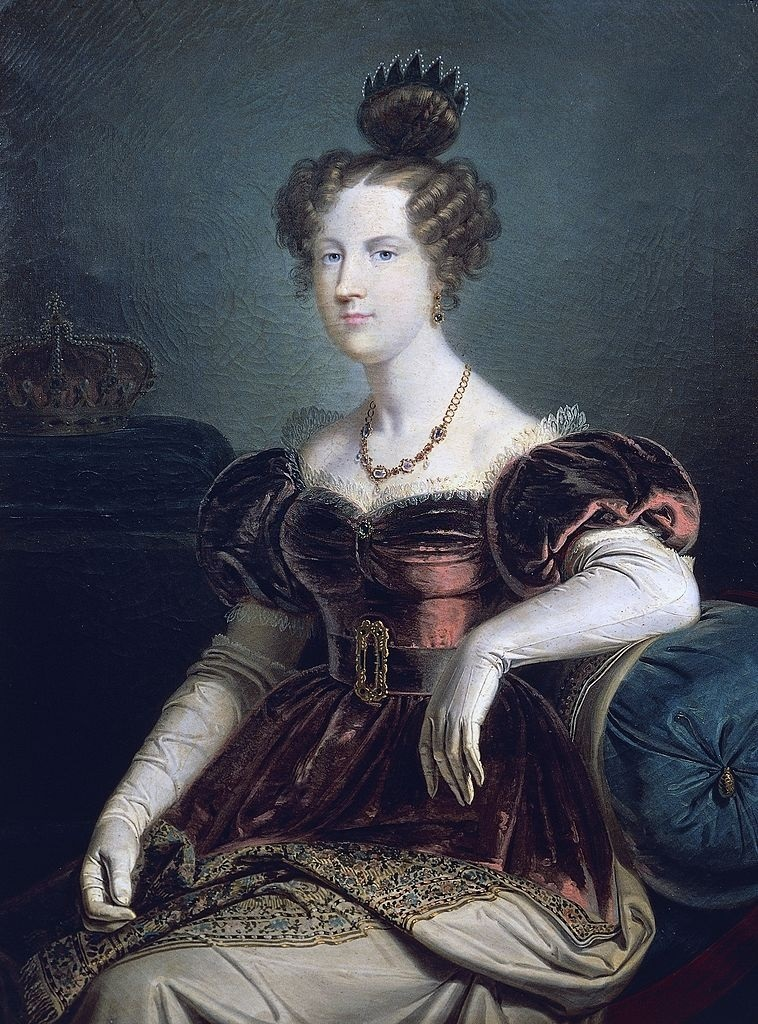
Portrait of Queen Maria Cristina by Giuseppe Patania, 1833

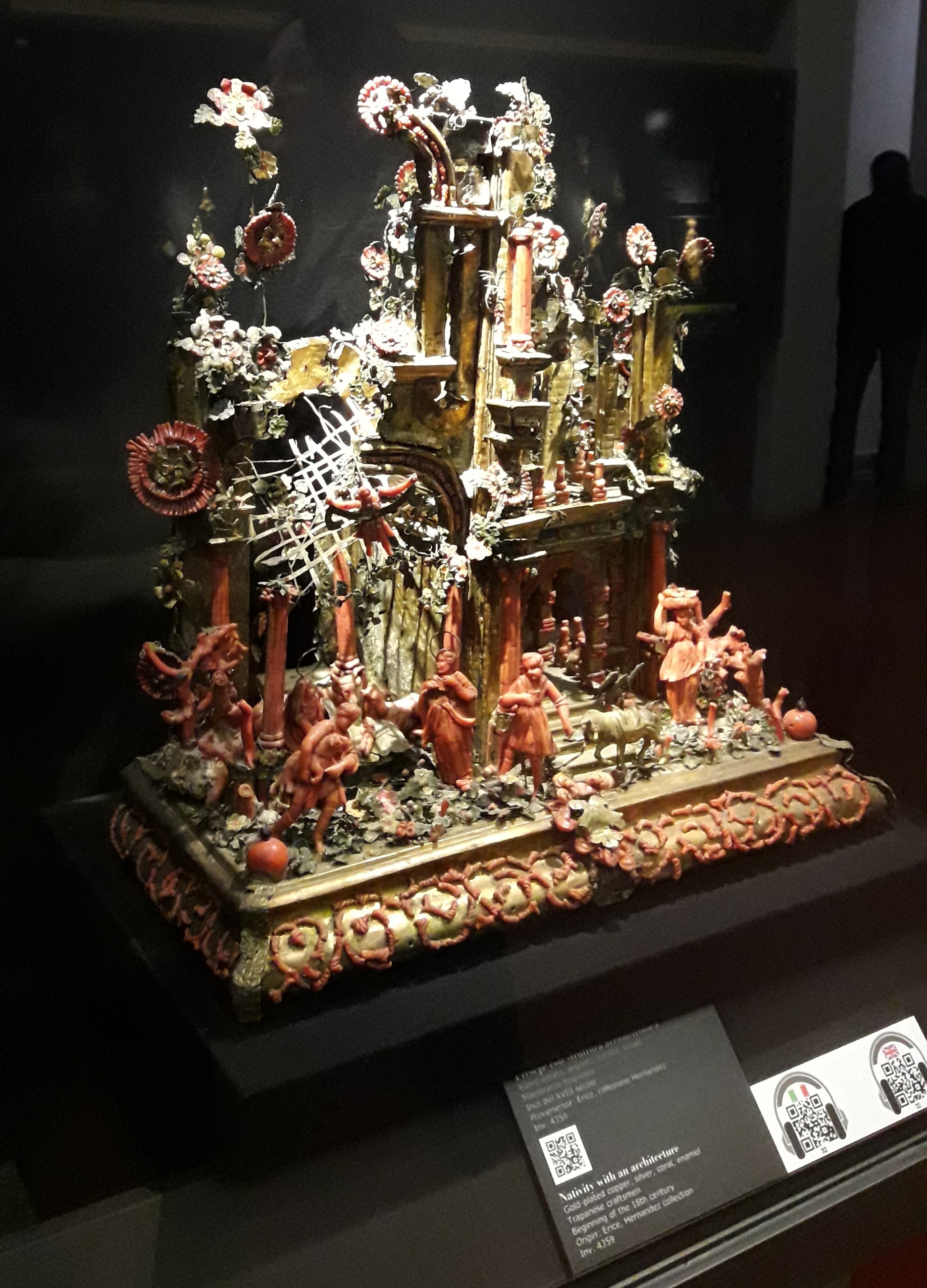
18th century crib made in Trapani

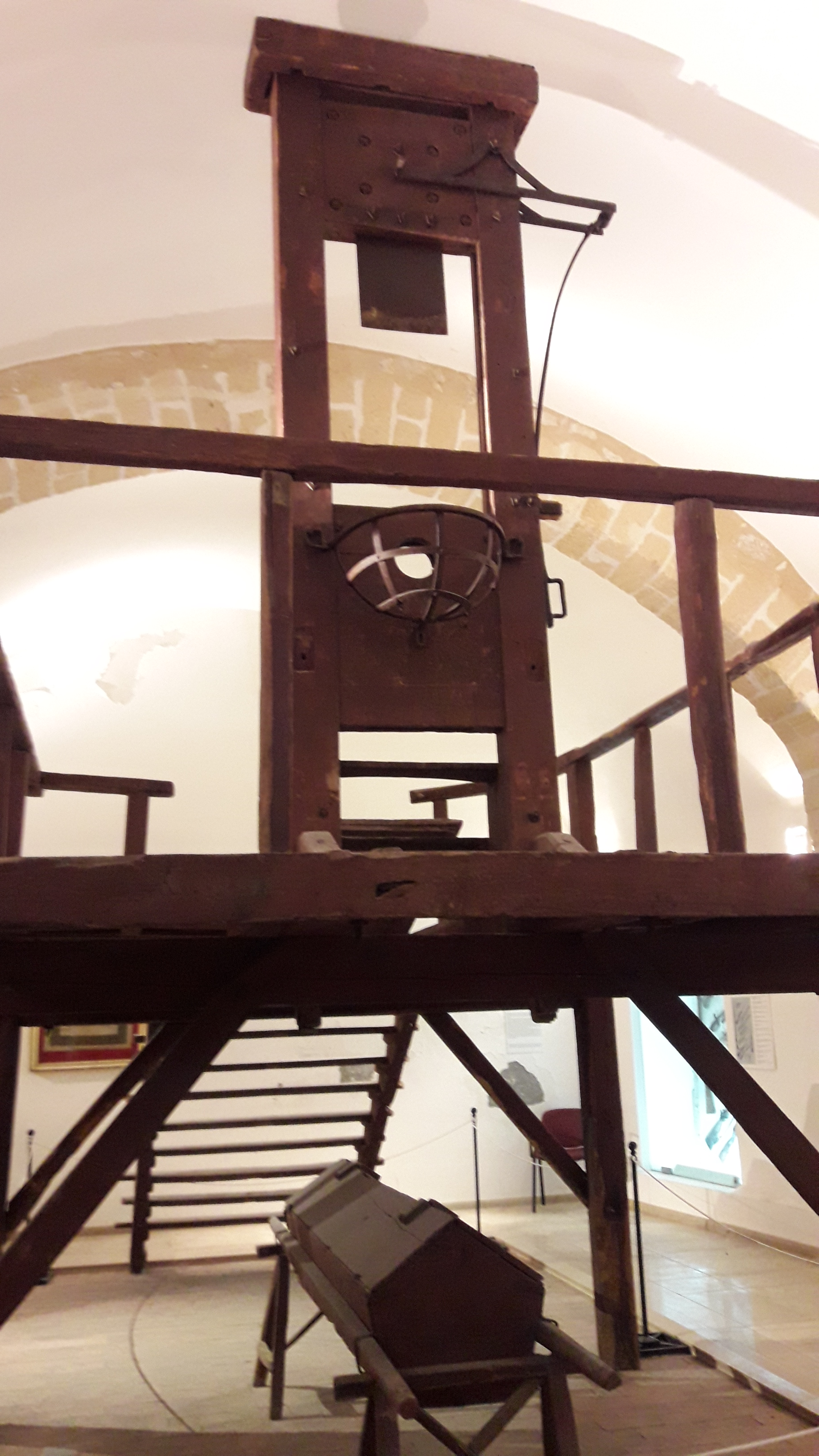
Bourbon guillotine, 1800

== Bibliography ==
- Vincenzo Scuderi, Il Museo Nazionale Pepoli in Trapani, Roma, 1965
- Museo Pepoli, Trapani, con testi di G. Bresc Bautier, V. Abbate, M.C. Di Natale, et al., Novecento editore, Palermo 1992.
- Memorie del Risorgimento nelle collezioni del Museo Pepoli, testi di Maria Luisa Famà, Salvatore Costanza e Gaetano Bongiovanni, Palermo, Regione Siciliana, 2003
- Il museo A. Pepoli di Trapani. Le collezioni archeologiche, a cura di Maria Luisa Famà, Edipuglia, 2009
- AA. VV., Il Museo Interdisciplinare Regionale Agostino Pepoli, Trapani 2013 (alcune pagine disponibili qui)
- AA. VV., 1914-2014. Museo Pepoli, Cento anni di storia, 2015
