= Saint Francis Receiving the Stigmata (Titian) =

Painting by Titian

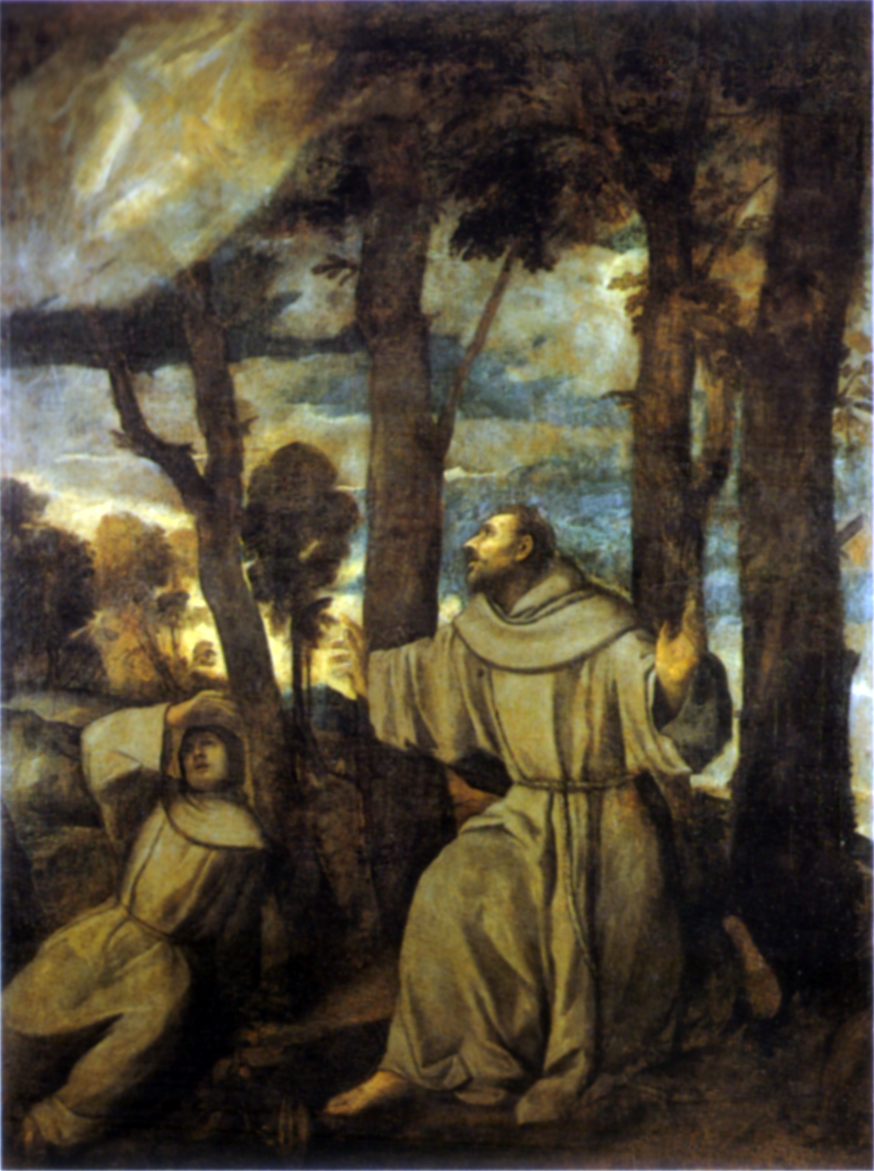
Saint Francis Receiving the Stigmata (c. 1525) by Titian

Saint Francis Receiving the Stigmata is an oil on canvas painting by Titian, now in the Museo regionale Agostino Pepoli in Trapani. Its treatment of colour has led some to date it to the 1530s or 1550s, but the usual dating is c. 1525.

The work was misattributed to Vincenzo da Pavia until 1946, when Roberto Longhi restored the attribution to Titian, now followed by the majority of art historians and confirmed by a 1953-1954 restoration which revealed Titian's signature. Its style is thought to be similar to his lost The Assassination of Saint Peter Martyr.

== See also ==
- List of works by Titian
