= Geronimo Gerardi =

Flemish painter (1595–1648)

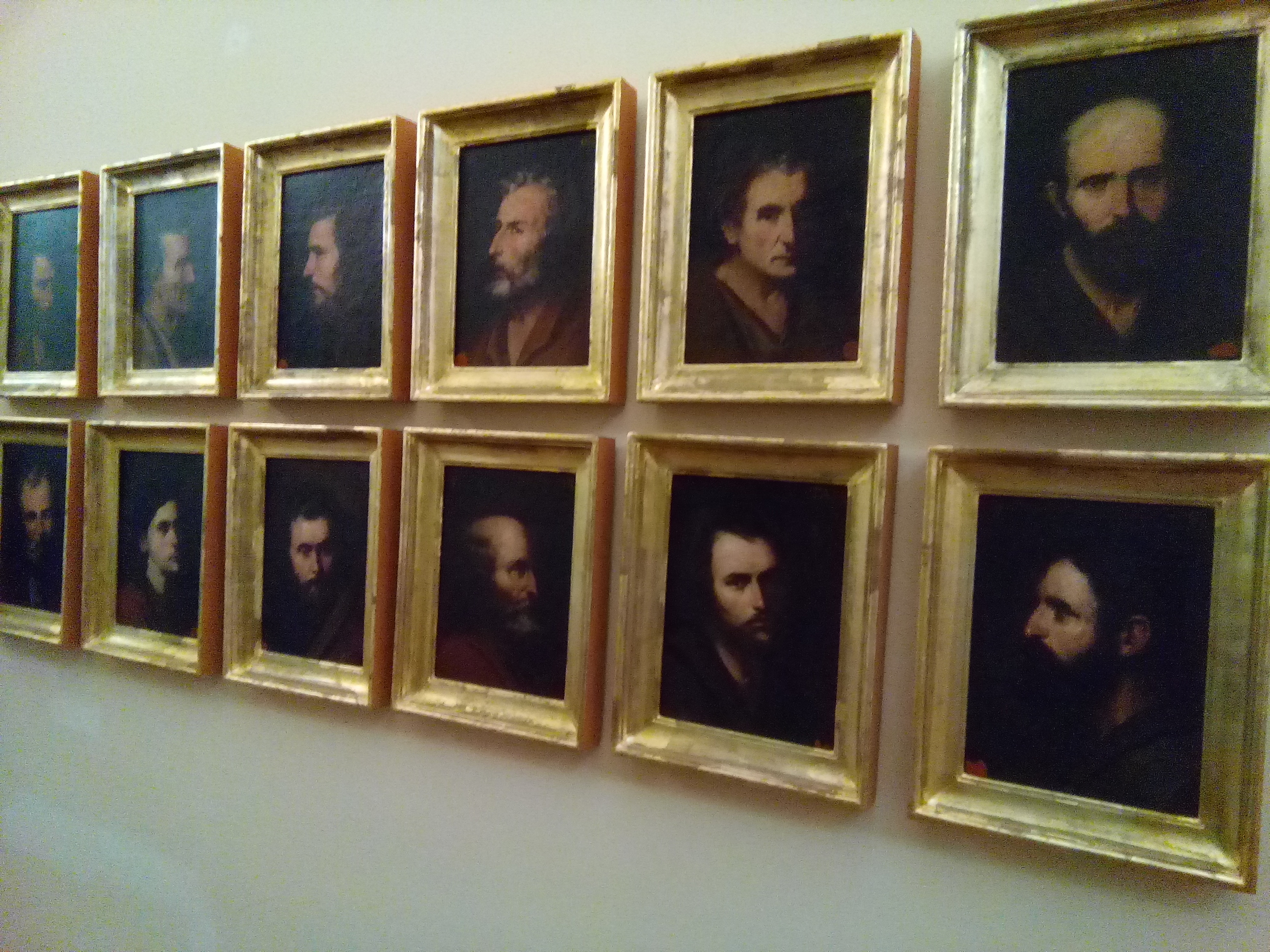
Twelve Apostles, Museo Pepoli, Trapani.

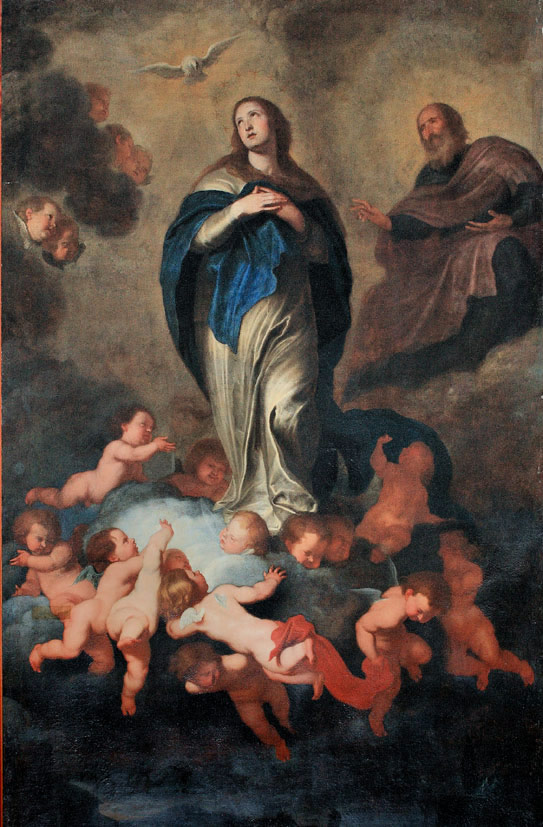
The Immaculate Conception, chiesa di Sant'Anna la Misericordia in Palermo.

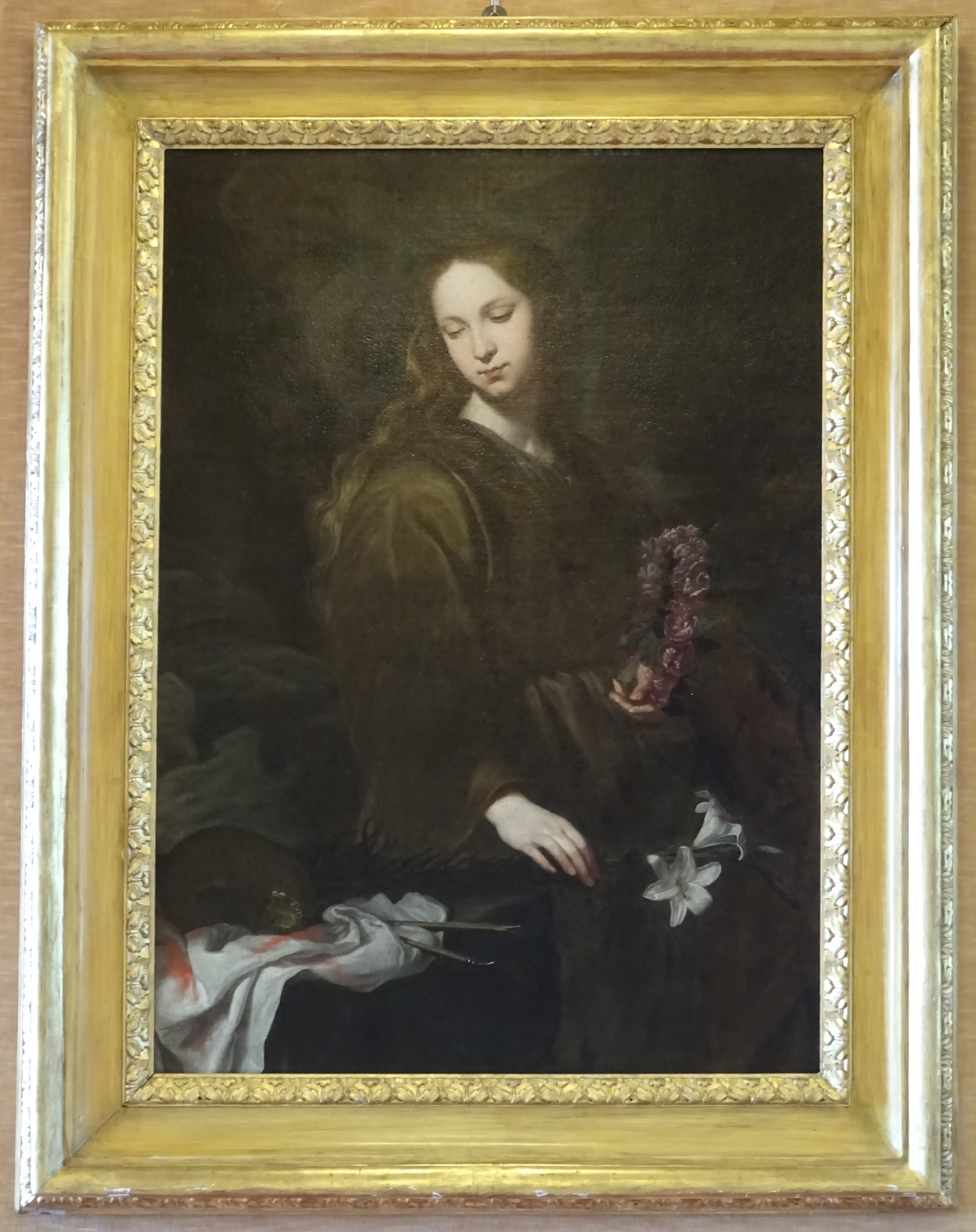
Santa Rosalia, Banca Carige collection in Genoa.

Geronimo Gerardi (1595–1648) was a Flemish artist active in Italy. He was born Guilliam Walsgart or Hyeronimus Gerards.

== Life ==
Born in Antwerp, in his youth he came into contact with Rubens and with Anthony van Dyck. From 1620 onwards he was active in Palermo and Trapani in Sicily, acting as Flemish consular agent in Trapani in 1631, remaining in that city until his death. During his time on the island he remained in contact with other Flemish painters there such as Antoon van Dyck and Giovanni Basquens.

The art historian Giovanni Mendola believes that his name ought to be the Italianisation of Guglielmo Walsgart, who he initially held to be another painter.

== Works ==
- Miracle of Saint Isidore Agricola (1641), private collection

=== Province of Palermo ===
==== Ciminna ====
- Madonna and Child Crowning Saint Rosalia with Saint John the Baptist and Saint Roch' (1627), oil on canvas, church of San Giovanni Battista

==== Palermo ====
- Nativity, painting, oratorio del Rosario di San Domenico.
- Immaculate Conception (1628–1631), painting, Sant'Anna la Misericordia.
- The Virgin Mary Offering the Missionary Standard to St Ignatius of Loyola and to St Francis Xavier, painting, Convitto Falcone.
- St Catherine of Alexandria, galleria regionale di Palazzo Abatellis.

=== Province of Messina ===
==== Motta d'Affermo ====
- Immaculate Conception, painting, duomo di Maria Santissima degli Angeli.

=== Province of Trapani ===
==== Trapani ====
- Immaculate Conception (1637), painting, opera custodita nella chiesa dell'Immacolata Concezione del Collegio dei Gesuiti
- Madonna del Rosario con i Santi Domenico e Caterina da Siena (1647), painting, chiesa della Badìa Nuova.
- Twelve Apostles, set of 12 oil on canvas paintings from the Collegio Gesuitico, now in the museo regionale Agostino Pepoli.
- Sant'Andrea, oil on canvas, now in the museo regionale Agostino Pepoli
- The Immaculate Conception, painting, church of San Francesco d'Assisi
- Adorazione dei pastori, oil on canvas, protobasilica cattedrale di San Lorenzo.
- Holy Family with St Joachim and St Anne, painting, Cappella di Sant'Alberto degli Abbati, basilica-santuario di Maria Santissima Annunziata

=== Genoa ===
- Banca Carige collection
  - Saint Rosalia
  - St Ursula.
