= Sant'Anna la Misericordia =

Church in Palermo, Sicily, Italy

Church of Saint Anne the Mercy
- Chiesa di Sant'Anna la Misericordia (in Italian)
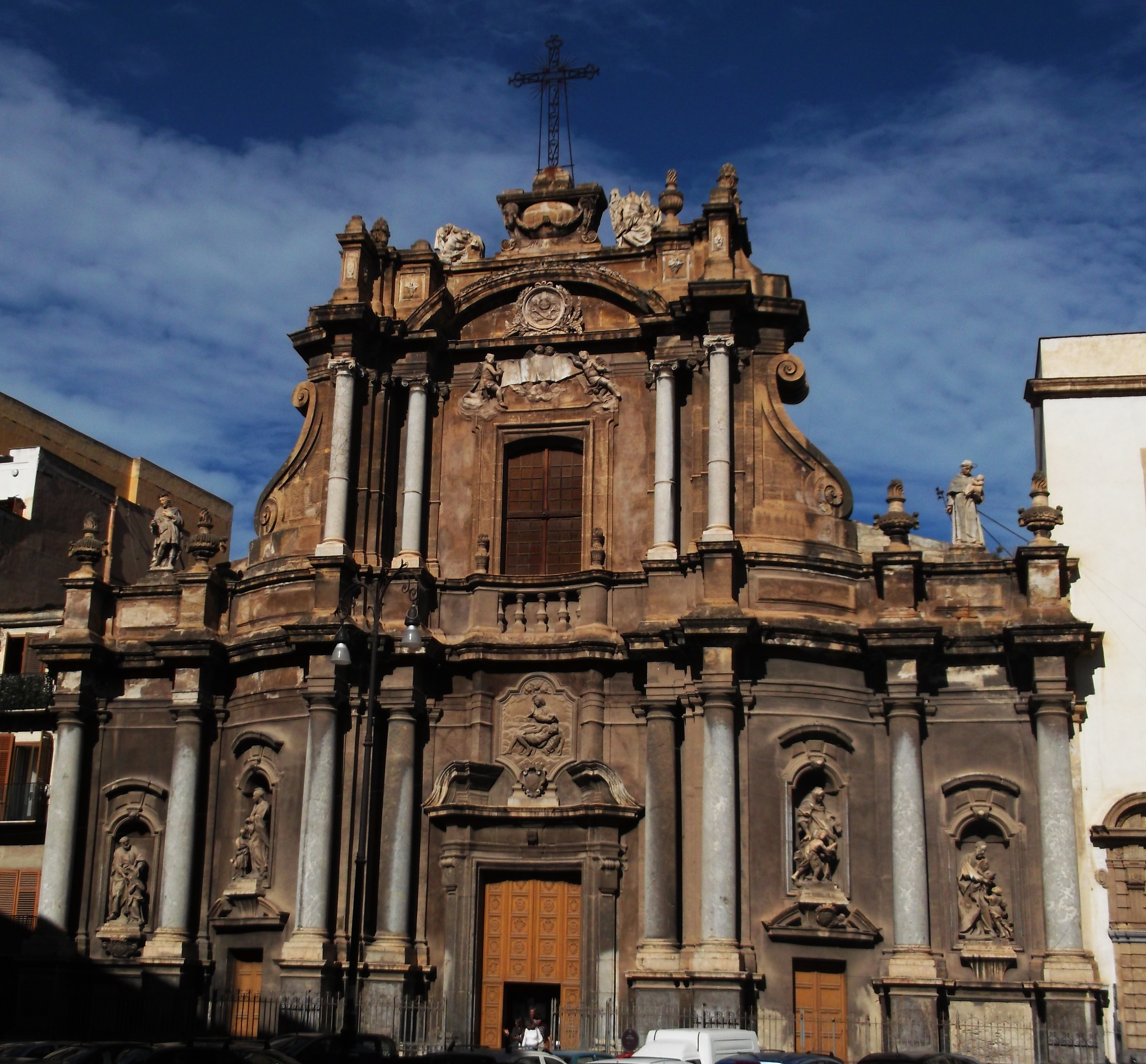
- Façade of the church

Religion
- Affiliation: Roman Catholic
- Province: Archdiocese of Palermo
- Rite: Roman Rite

Location
- Location: Palermo, Italy
- Interactive map of Church of Saint Anne the Mercy
- Coordinates: 38°06′55″N 13°21′55″E

Architecture
- Architects: Mariano Smiriglio, Giovanni Biagio Amico
- Style: Baroque, Renaissance
- Groundbreaking: 1606
- Completed: 1632

Website
- www.chiesasantannator.it

The Church of Saint Anne the Mercy (Italian: Chiesa di Sant'Anna la Misericordia or simply Sant'Anna) is a Baroque church of Palermo. It is located in the area of the ancient market of Lattarini, in the quarter of the Kalsa, within the historic centre of Palermo. The church is kept by the Third Order Regular of St. Francis of Penance.

== History ==
The complex of Sant'Anna, including the church and a convent, was built in a zone formerly occupied by an unhealthy inlet, circumscribed by cliffs and filled by alluvial deposits of the former Kemonia river, which dried up a four centuries ago. In the period of the Sicilian Vespers the area housed the residence of Joanne De Saint Remy, collaborator of Charles of Anjou.

In the 16th century, a chapel dedicated to Our Lady Of Pity is recorded in the so-called “Contrada della Misericordia”. In this chapel Tommaso de Vigilia painted a fresco of the Pietà. Over time the popular devotion to this icon increased. In 1596 a structure located near the chapel and used as granary was converted into a place of worship. The fresco was hung in this new temple. In 1597 the convent was built.

Since the chapel was too small for the liturgical needs, the authorities of Palermo decided to enlarge the building with patronage from the noble families and the community. The architectural project was made by the senatorial architect Mariano Smiriglio. On 26 October 1606 the groundbreaking was launched. The church was completed in 1632 and consecrated on 13 November 1639 by the bishop of Agrigento Francesco Traina. The temple was dedicated to Saint Anne, mother of Mary, becoming known as Sant'Anna la Misericordia.

Over the centuries the church was damaged on several occasions by earthquakes. In 1726, the earthquake of Terrasini toppled the façade. The current baroque façade was designed by Giovanni Biagio Amico.

After the unification of Italy, the church and the convent were confiscated by the state. For several years the complex was used as granary. In 1925 the church and a portion of the convent returned into the possession of the friars. Today the former convent is part of the Galleria d'Arte Moderna Palermo, a museum of Italian art from the 19th and early 20th centuries.

== Art ==
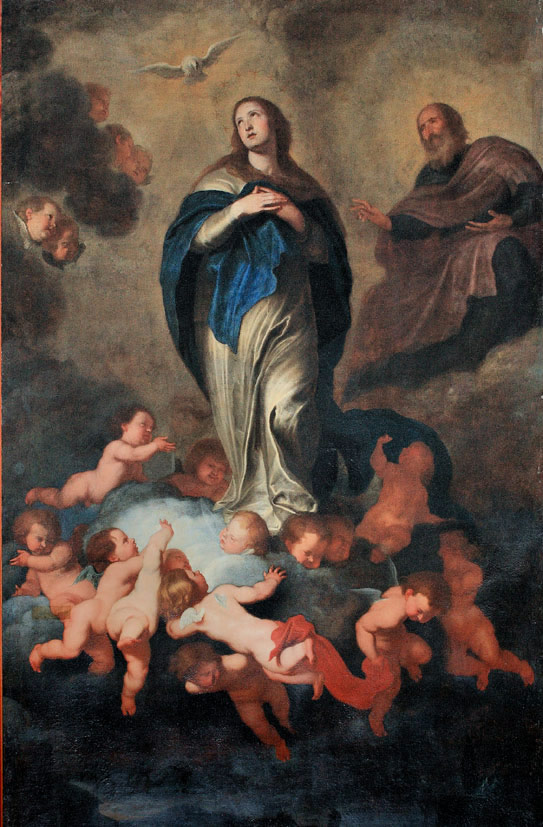
Immaculate Conception, Guilliam Walsgart, 1631

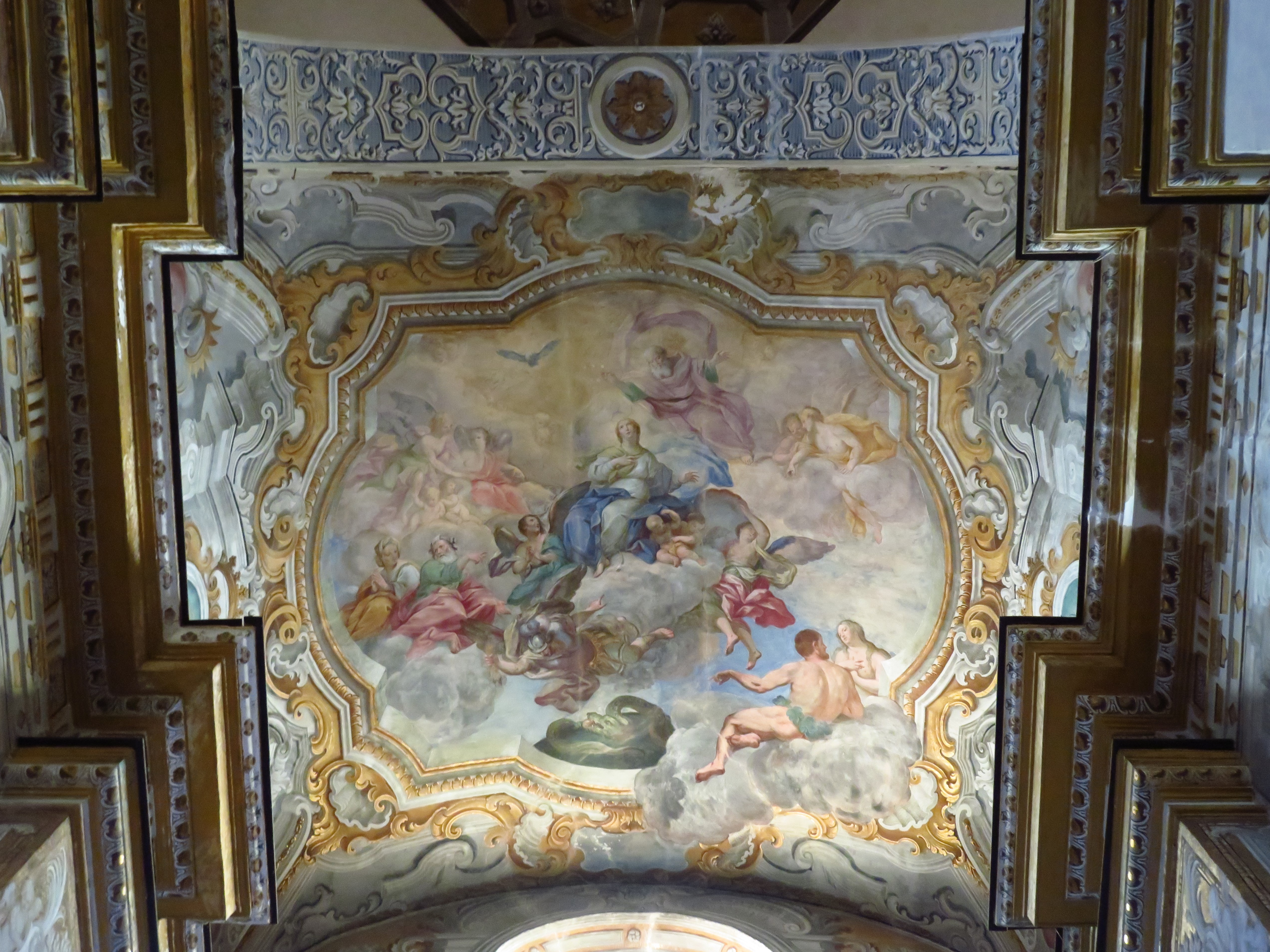
Assumption of the Virgin, Filippo Tancredi

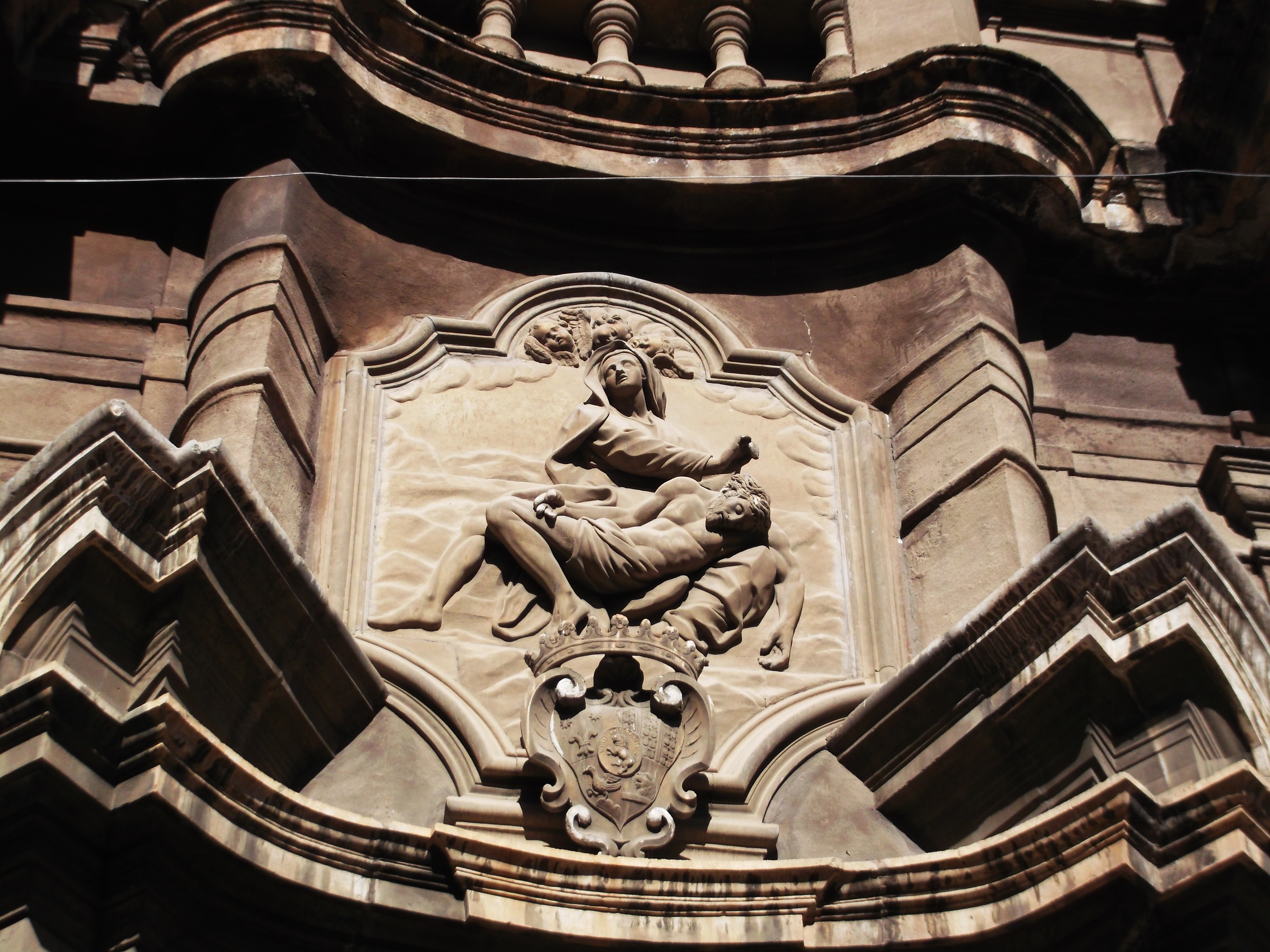
Pietà, Lorenzo Marabitti

=== Paintings ===
Oil on canvas:

- Annunciation of Saint Anne, Elia Interguglielmi
- Saint Anne teaching Mary, Elia Interguglielmi
- Saint Nicholas in Glory, Elia Interguglielmi
- Holy Family with Saint Anne and Saint Joachim, Melchiorre Barresi
- Blessed William of Scicli, Leonardo Bazzano
- Saint Francis and Saint Elizabeth, Leonardo Bazzano
- Saint Rosalia praying over the city, Vincenzo La Barbera
- Virgin appearing to Saint Diego, Filippo Tancredi
- Immaculate Conception, Guilliam Walsgart
- Our Lady Refuge of Sinners, unknown author

Frescoes:

- Our Lady Of Pity, Tommaso de Vigilia
- Ascension of Jesus, Vito D'Anna
- Assumption of the Virgin, Filippo Tancredi
- Madonna and Saint Simon Stock, Filippo Tancredi
- Elizabeth of Hungary and Saint Louis of France, unknown author

=== Sculptures ===
High reliefs:

- Pietà, Lorenzo Marabitti

Statues:

- The statues of the facade were drawn by Giacomo Serpotta and sculpted by Giacomo Pennino and Lorenzo Marabitti. They represent the saints Joseph, Elizabeth, Anne, Joachim, Louis and Anthony of Padua. Other statues are located inside the church.

== See also ==
- Kalsa
- Lattarini
