= Tommaso de Vigilia =

Italian painter

Tommaso de Vigilia (active 1480–1497) was an Italian painter of the Renaissance period.

== Life ==
He was mainly active in Palermo. His earliest existing work is a triptych once belonging to the Duke of Verdura at Palermo, representing a Virgin and Child with four Saints, dated 1486; and his latest a St. Nicholas enthroned in a glory of Angels (1489) for the church of San Niccolo, Palermo. The ceiling of the church of the Santissima Annunziata, in the same city, is decorated with a series of sixteen scenes from the life of the Virgin, on canvas, by Tommaso. Other churches in Palermo possess paintings by him.

== Sources ==
- Bryan, Michael (1889). Walter Armstrong; Robert Edmund Graves (eds.). Dictionary of Painters and Engravers, Biographical and Critical. Vol. II: L-Z. London: George Bell and Sons. p. 668.
