= Sicilian Renaissance =

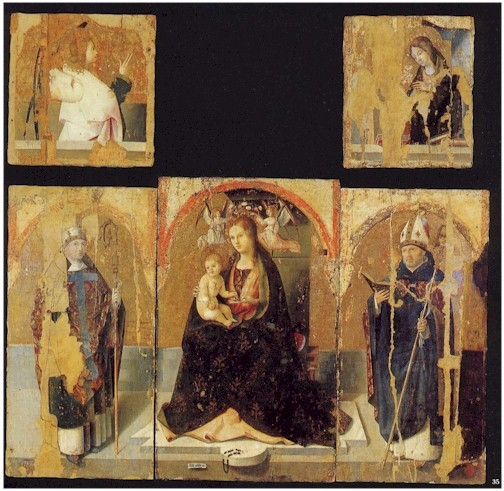
'Madonna of the Rosary' Altarpiece by Antonello da Messina, Museo Regionale di Messina

The Sicilian Renaissance forms part of the wider currents of scholarly and artistic development known as the Italian Renaissance. Spreading from the movement's main centres in Florence, Rome and Naples, when Renaissance Classicism reached Sicily it fused with influences from local late medieval and International Gothic art and Flemish painting to form a distinctive hybrid. The 1460s is usually identified as the start of the development of this distinctive Renaissance on the island, marked by the presence of Antonello da Messina, Francesco Laurana and Domenico Gagini, all three of whom influenced each other, sometimes basing their studios in the same city at the same time.

The Flemish influence was particularly strong in Messina due to its trade links with the Hanseatic League and the resulting influx of Flemish artists to Sicily in both the Renaissance and Baroque eras. In the 15th and 16th centuries the Kingdom of Sicily was initially part of the dynastic confederation headed by the Crown of Aragon and later part of the Spanish Empire under Charles V and his successors, further linking it to artistic developments in the Low Countries, Germany and Spain.

== Historiography ==
In the past, some artistic historiography agreed in considering Sicilian culture in an isolated and marginalized condition during the historical phase of the Spanish Viceroyalty, thus delaying the study of art produced in Sicily during the Renaissance and beyond. Later studies challenged this position. The first studies and reevaluations concerned the Baroque period, but later studies greatly expanded the artistic panorama of the Renaissance period, in Sicily and southern Italy in general.

== Lost works ==
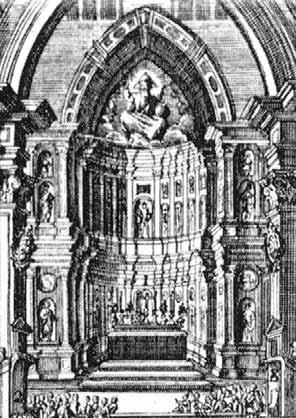
The high altar of Palermo Cathedral in an 18th-century print

Sicily is particularly prone to earthquakes, and these destroyed many works of art. Particularly vulnerable is the city and area of Messina (earthquakes of 1562, 1649, 1783, 1894 and 1908), but also other areas of the island such as the Val di Noto (earthquakes of 1542, 1693, 1757, 1848). The reconstruction of a complete panorama of artistic and especially architectural production is therefore problematic; and artistic historiography, especially for architecture, is fragmented in the face of countless works that have disappeared or dramatically changed. Exemplary in this regard is the architectural production of Andrea Calamech and Camillo Camilliani, which has been practically erased.

== 15th century ==
=== Antonello and painting ===
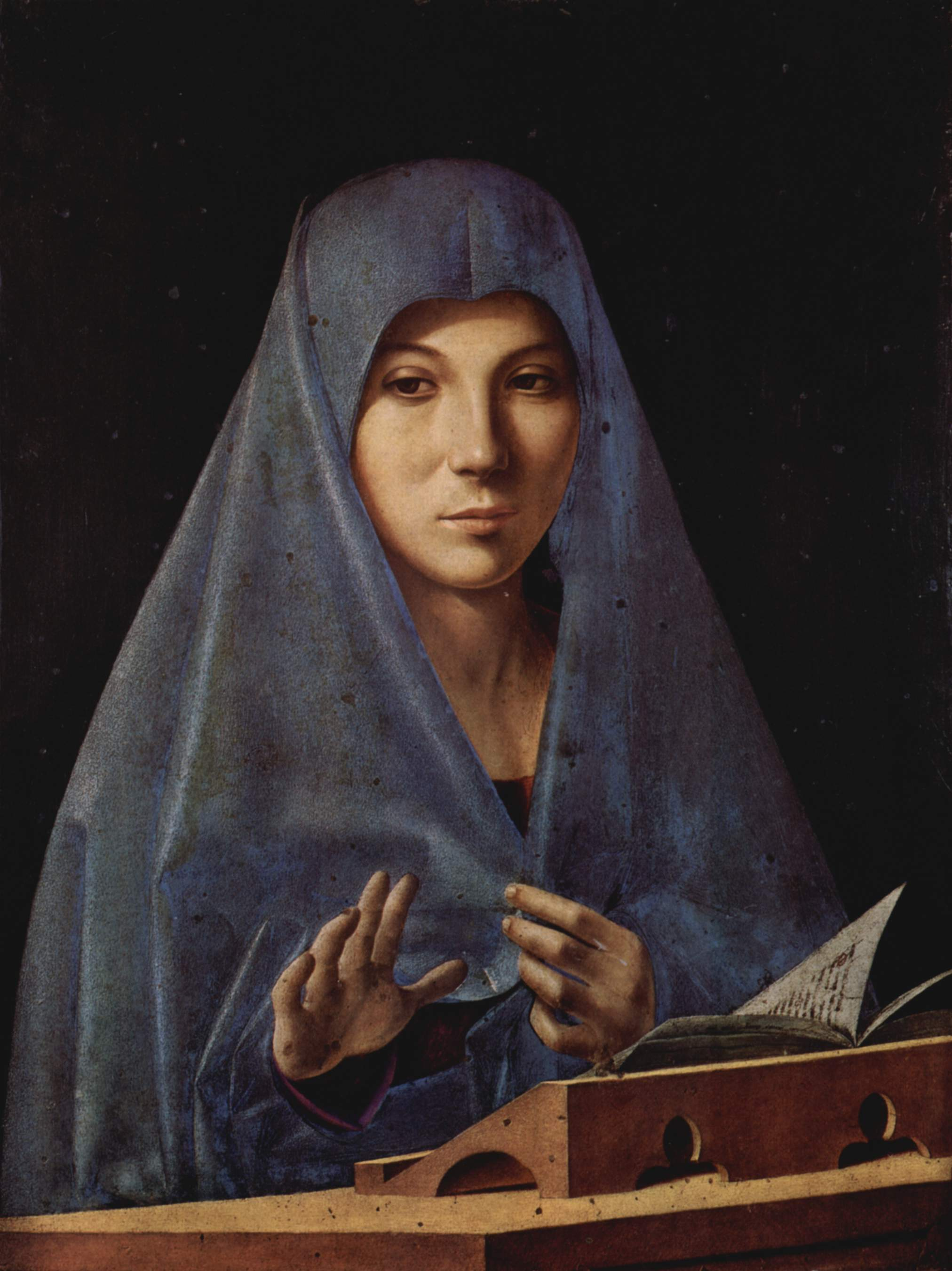
Annunciation in Palermo

Sicily's early Renaissance was dominated by Antonello da Messina, who trained in Naples, Venice, possibly Milan and indirectly in Flanders, showing the circulation of ideas which marked this era. His commissions from Sicily and his decision to return there in 1476 after his time in Venice made him the island's first Renaissance artist, as did his busy studio, later continued by his family, which fused local traditions with a new taste for the human form, portraiture and the artist as a valued genius rather than simply an anonymous artisan.

Neither his family members (his son Iacobello and his nephews Antonio di Saliba, Pietro di Saliba and Salvo d'Antonio) nor any of his direct and indirect pupils and followers (Alessandro Padovano, Giovanni Maria Trevisano, Giovannello da Itala, Marco Costanzo, Antonino Giuffré, Alfonso Franco, Francesco Pagano, some of whom were also active in Venice became major artists in their own right.

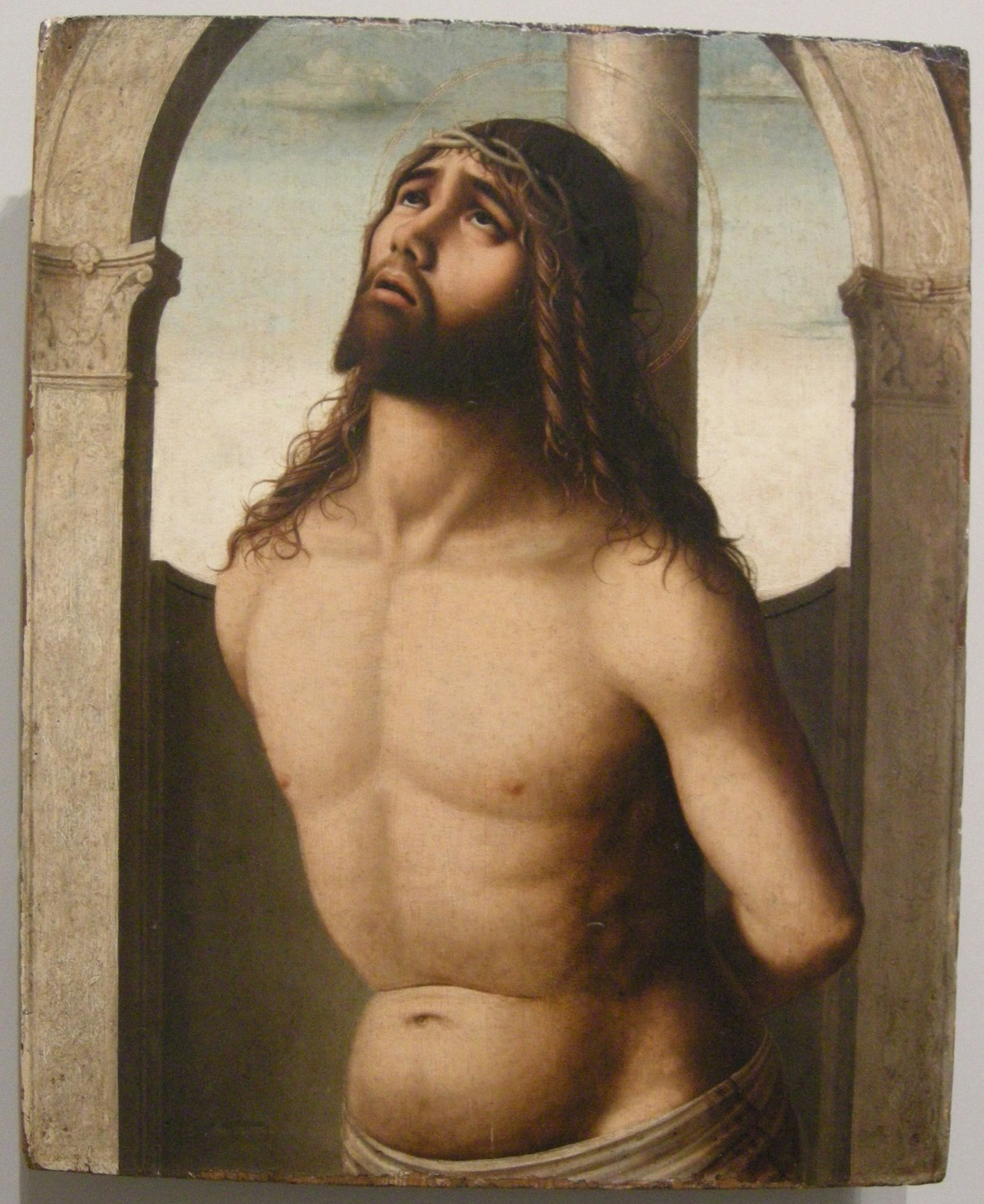
Christ at the Column, follower of Antonello da Messina

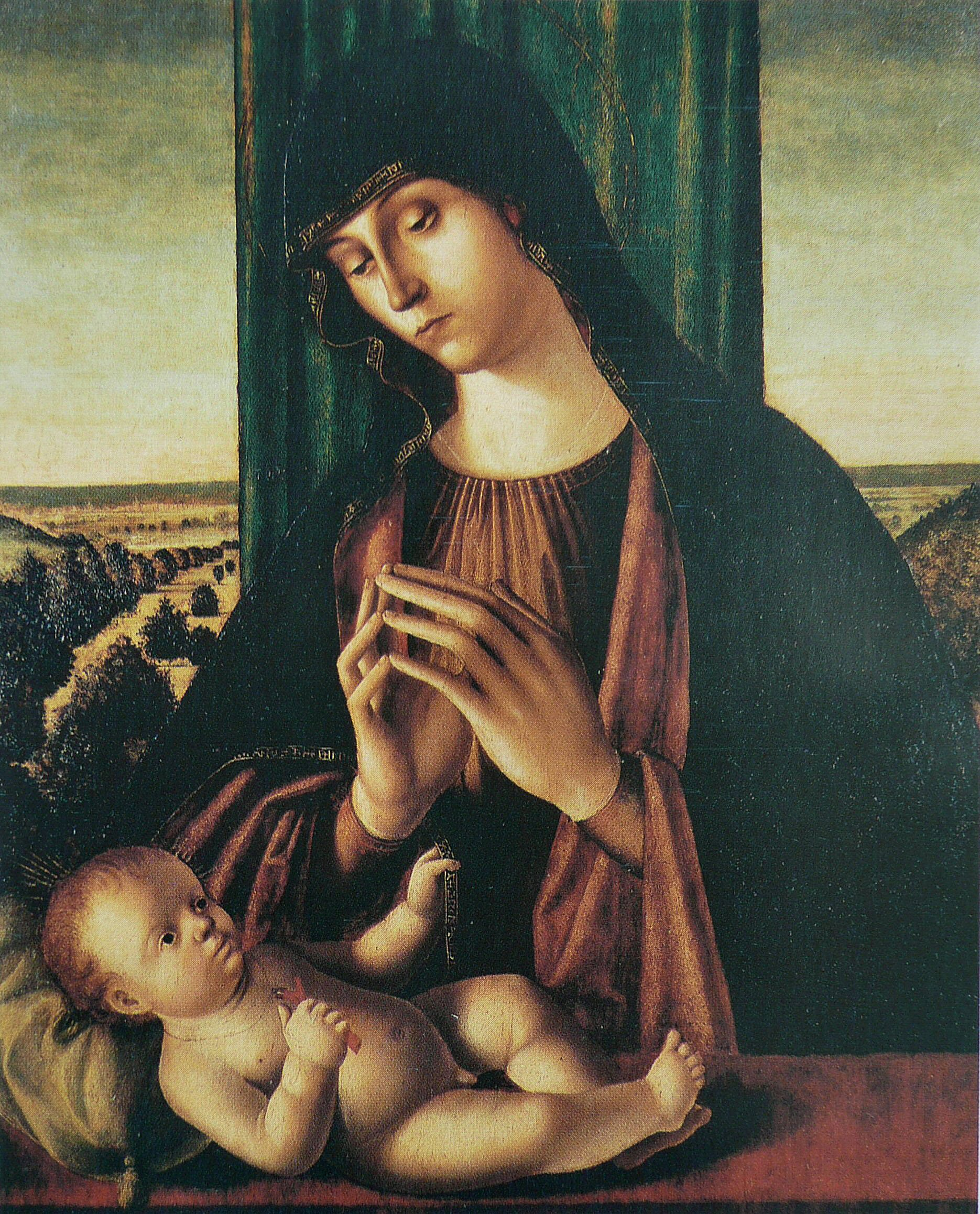
Madonna and Child, by Antonio di Saliba

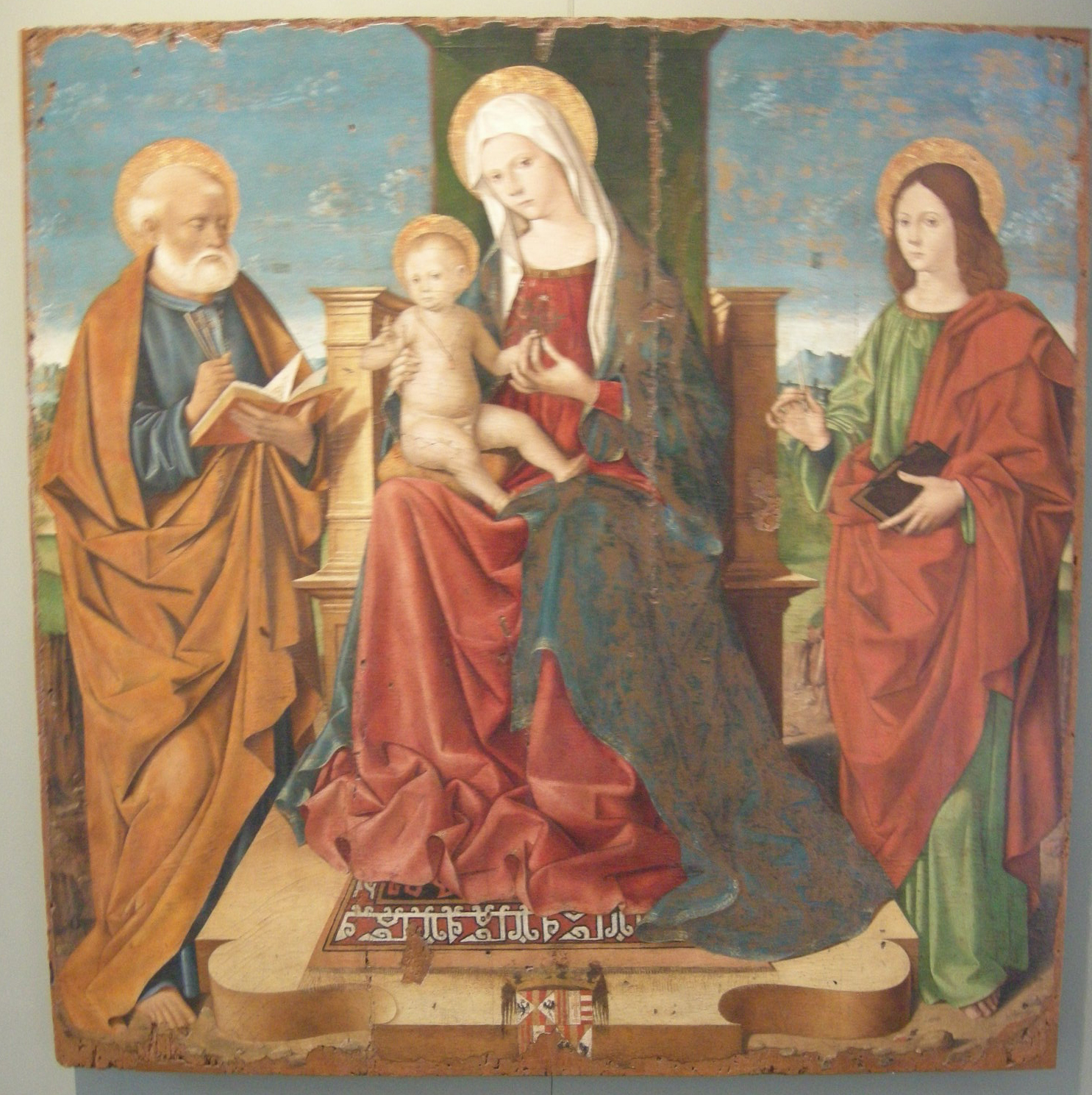
Madonna and Child with Saints by Salvo d'Antonio

=== Sculpture in Palermo ===
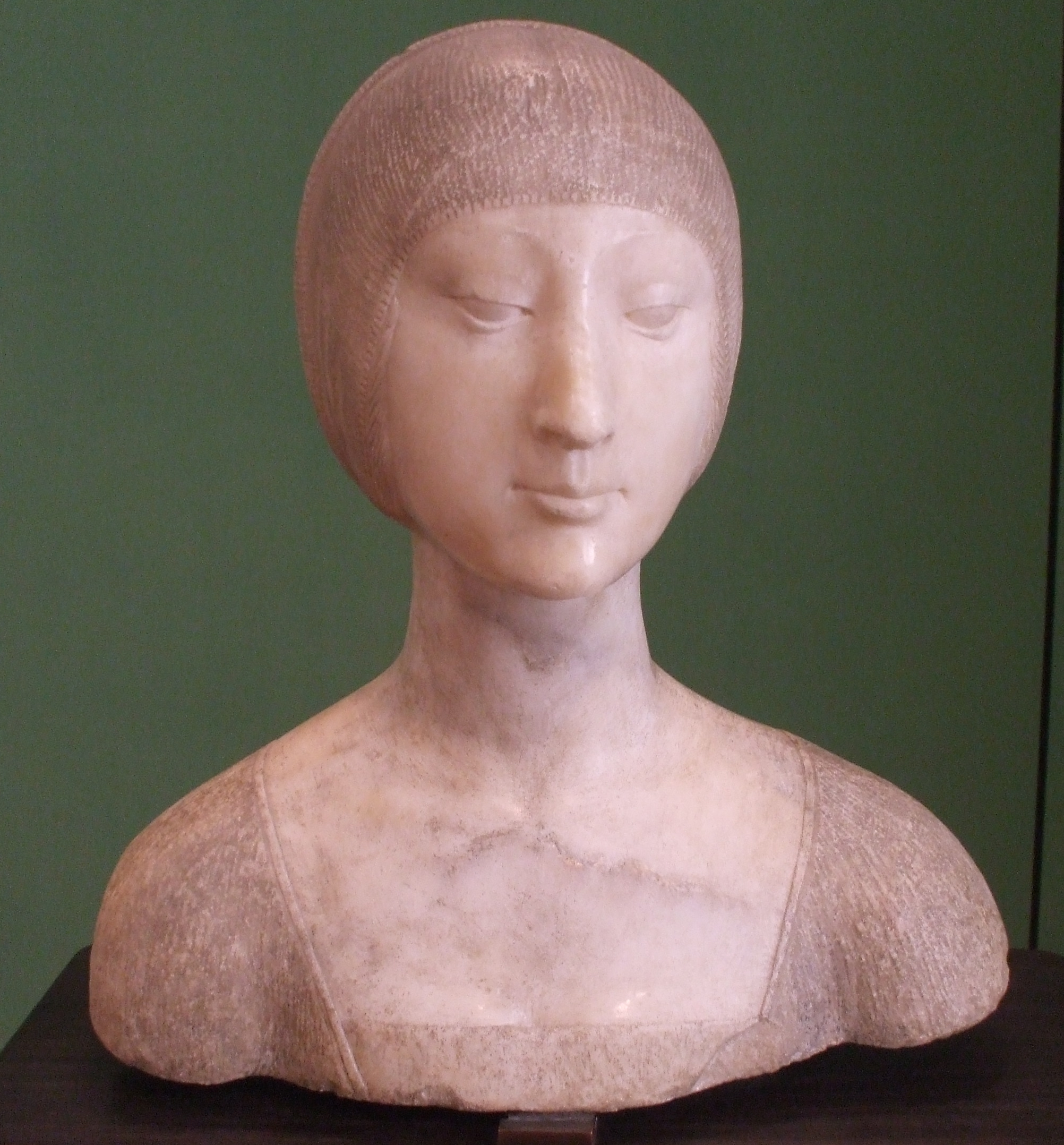
Portrait of Eleanor of Aragon by Francesco Laurana

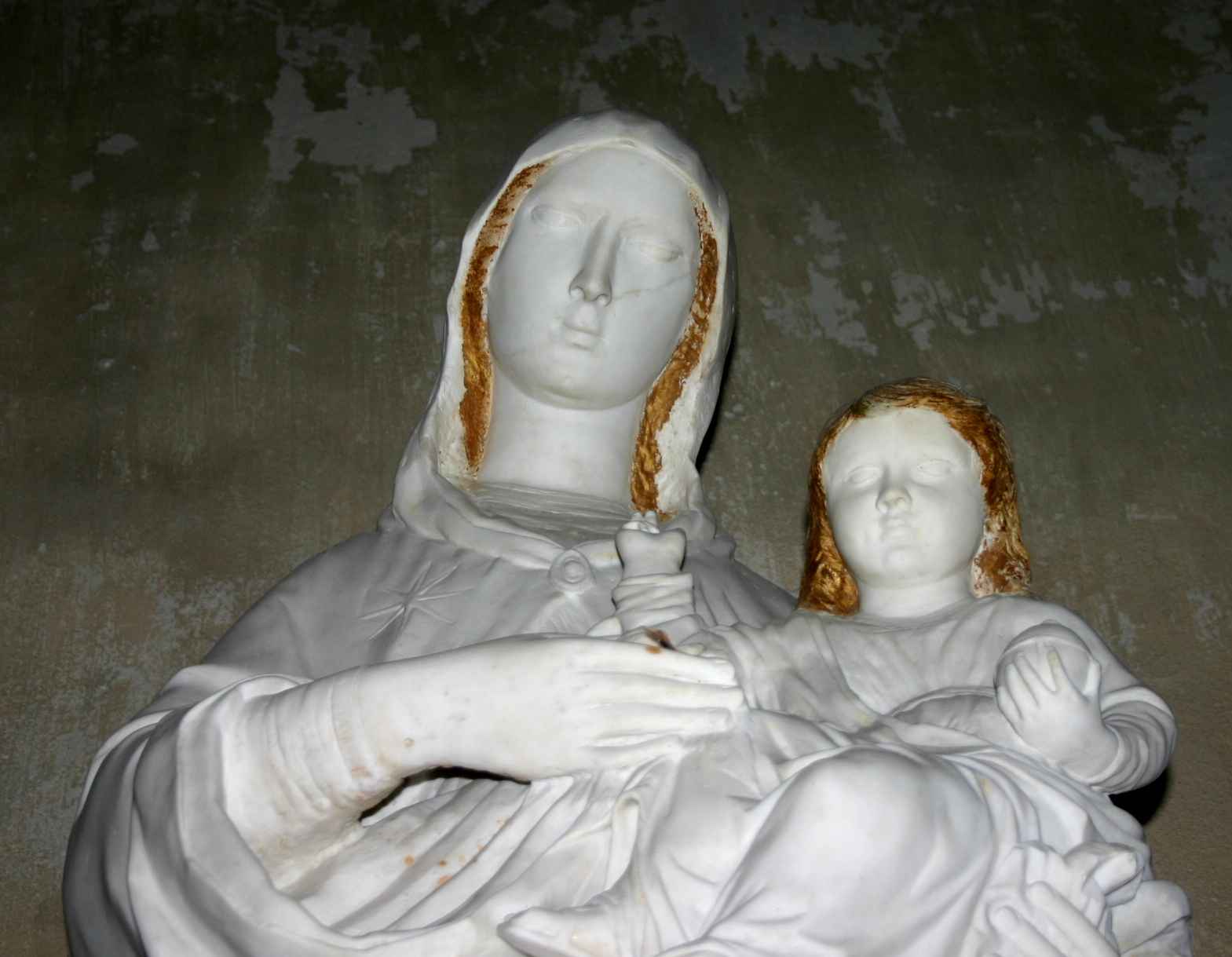
Domenico Gagini, Madonna and Child

Other marble sculptors from Tuscany and Lombardy also opened studios on Sicily, mainly in Palermo and Messina; these included the Lombard Gabriele di Battista who had worked in Naples like Gagini. Palermo's marble sculptors, mainly from Carrara, even formed a corporation or guild in 1487. They produced altarpieces, doorways, window-frames and columns, which bit by bit added decorative language to native Sicilian architecture according to their commissioners' more and more pressing requests, melding Late Gothic architecture with Renaissance architectural sculpture.

=== Sculpture in Messina ===
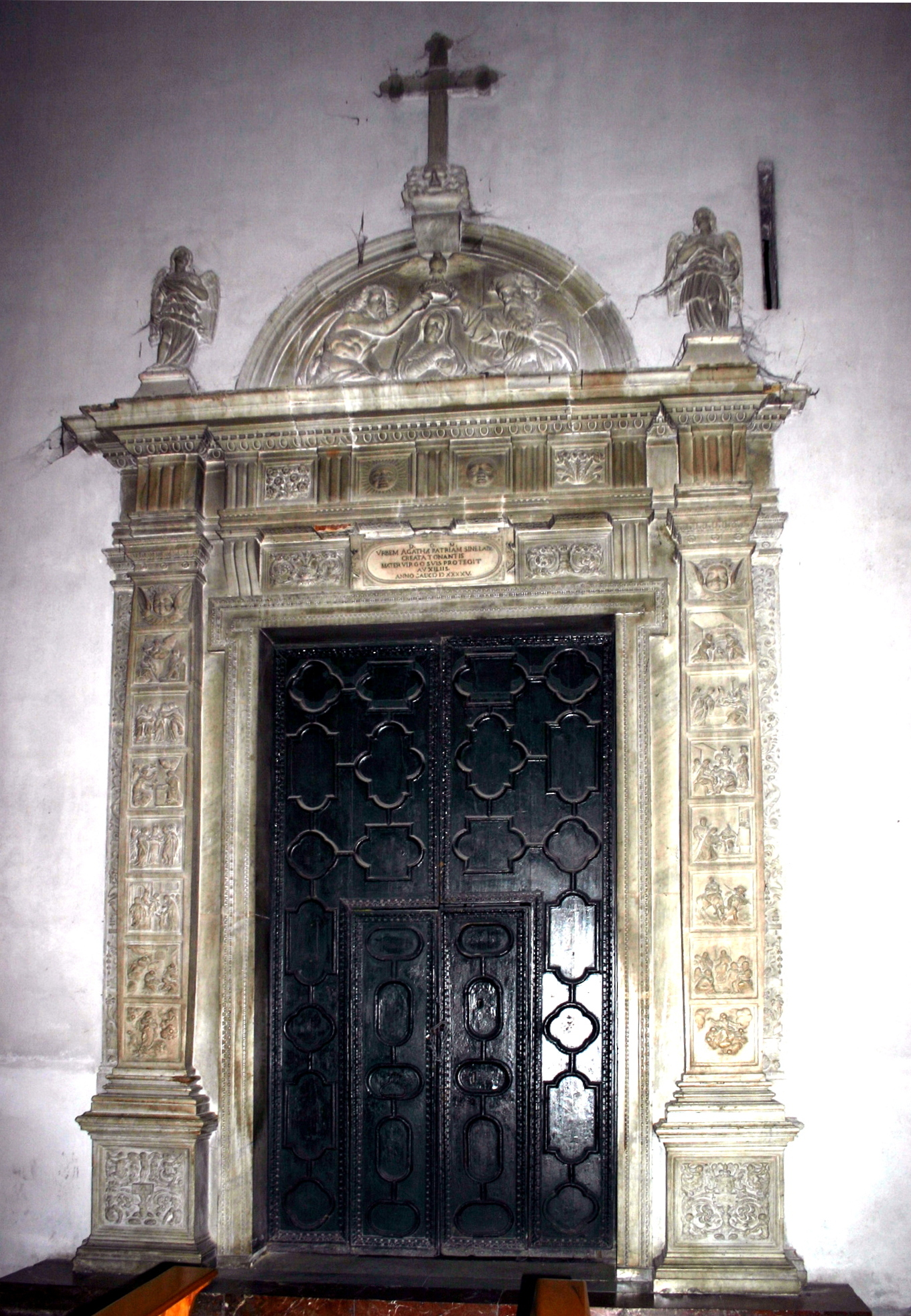
Inner door of Catania Cathedral by Giovan Battista Mazzolo

The most notable artists of this period active in Messina were Giorgio da Milano, Andrea Mancino, Bernardino Nobile and especially Giovan Battista Mazzolo from Carrara, head of an important studio which included Messina-born Antonio Freri. Domenico Gagini's son Antonello was also in Messina between 1498 and 1507.

As in Palermo, Toscano and Lombard artists brought the classicising sculptural elements to the city and its surrounding areas as well as Calabria. Earlier historians have argued that these elements were imposed on Messina before the end of the 15th century, before they reached the rest of Sicily, but the consensus is now that sculpture in Messina remained in its Late Gothic mode throughout the 15th century, despite the presence of some Renaissance decorative elements – although many examples from this period have been destroyed by earthquakes, making a full investigation of it difficult. This dialogue between architecture and sculpture can be seen in the late 15th-century Renaissance doorways of the church of Santa Lucia del Mela, attributed to Gabriele di Battista, and the 1494 side door to the church of Mistretta, attributed to Giorgio da Milano.

== Early 16th century ==
=== Architecture ===
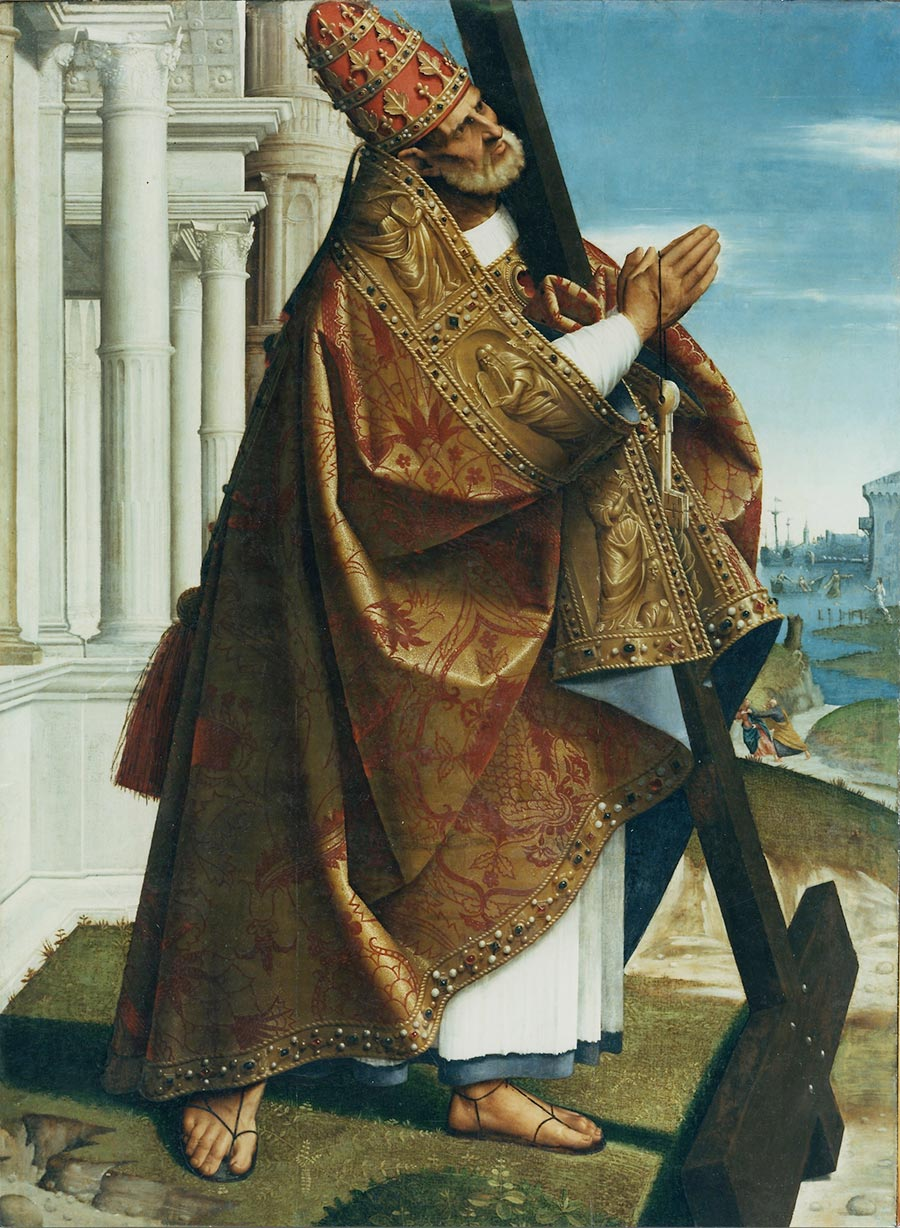
Saint Peter by Girolamo Alibrandi

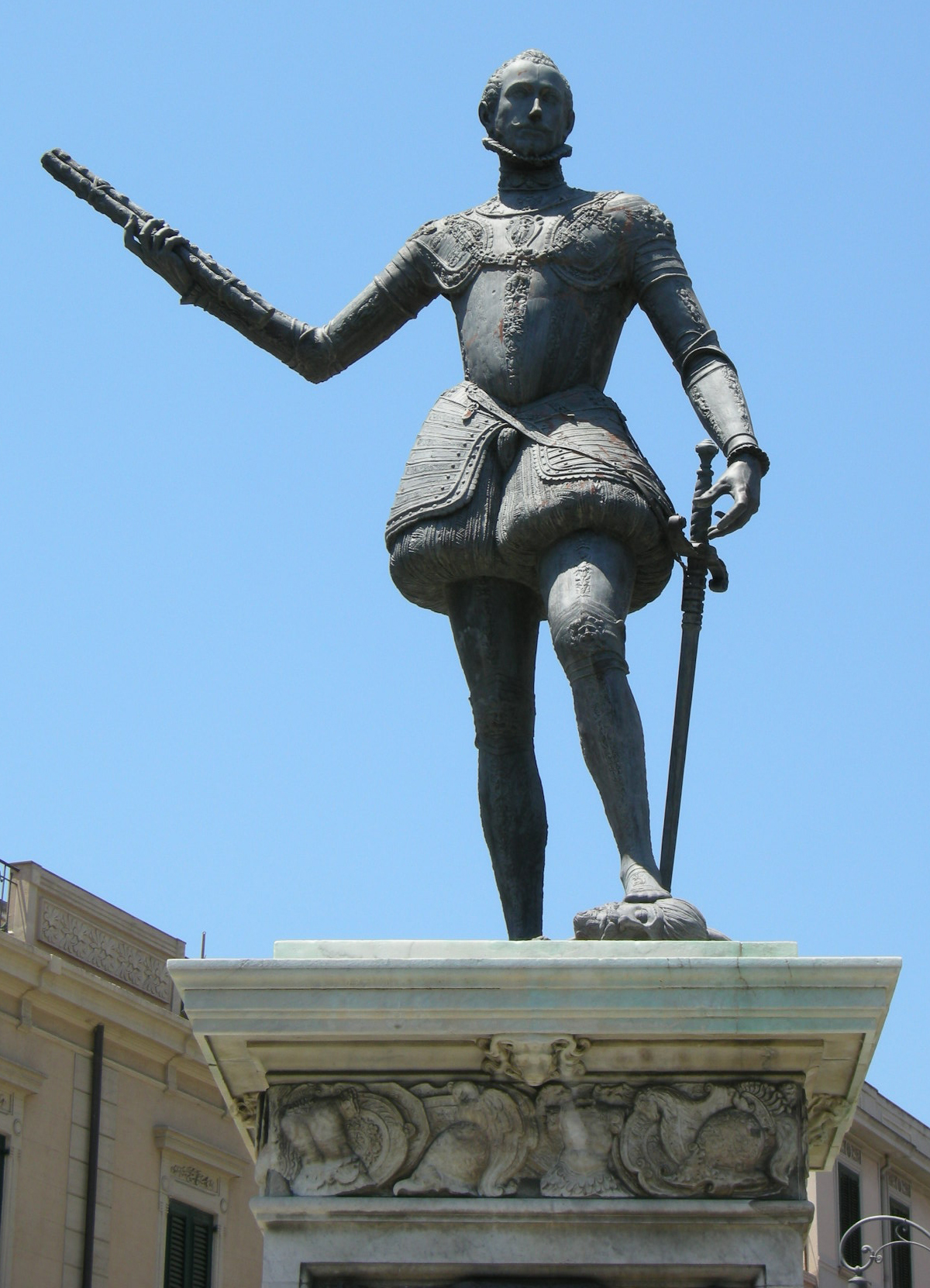
Andrea Calamech's monument to Don John of Austria

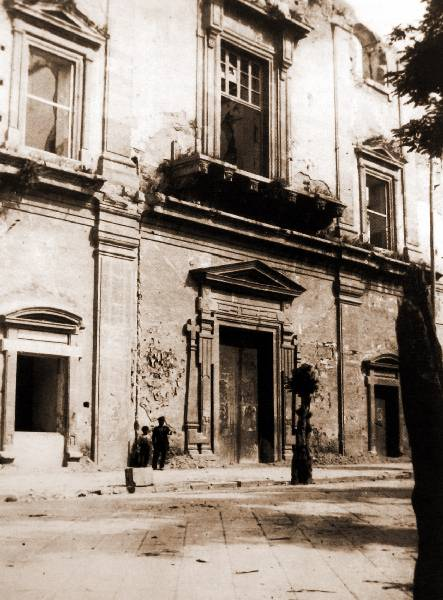
Andrea Calamech's Ospedale Maggiore in Messina

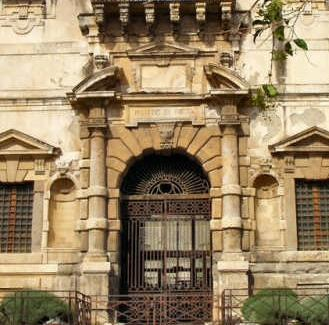
The doorway to the Monte di Pietà in Messina, designed by Natale Masuccio

Little by little Renaissance classical elements were absorbed into Sicilian architecture, mainly coalescing episodically as in Syracuse Cathedral's sacristy or in small buildings such as the chapels added to churches. Those chapels included the Naselli chapel at San Francesco in Comiso, the Confrati chapel at Santa Maria di Betlem in Modica, the 'Dormitio Virginis' chapel at Santa Maria delle Scale in Ragusa, the Marinai chapel at Annunziata church in Trapani (designed by Gabriele di Battista).

The Renaissance style was also used for a new facade of Syracuse Cathedral (destroyed in the 1693 earthquake) and Antonello Gagini's grandiose marble 'tribuna' in Palermo Cathedral (destroyed at the end of the 18th century).

=== Sculpture ===
16th-century sculpture on Sicily played a key role in the island's decisive move from the International Gothic to Renaissance style. This evolution occurred differently in Messina compared to the rest of the island. In Palermo, for example, the Gagini workshop was active throughout the century and beyond, alternating between repetitive studio works and prestigious commissions which also included typically Sicilian forms such as marble tabernacles flanked by angels. Its most important artist was Antonello Gagini, son of Domenico, 'console' of Palermo's marble-workers. Antonello's artistic training was a complex one, taking him to Rome where he worked alongside Michelangelo; and he also worked in Messina. That up-to-date training allowed him to override the stylistic features he had learned from Laurana and his own father Domenico, which by then had become fashionable.

By contrast, an influx of several important Tuscan sculptors to Messina long dominated the city's sculpture, spreading Mannerism not only throughout Sicily but also to Calabria. After a long period of wandering, Michelangelo's pupil Giovanni Angelo Montorsoli settled in Messina from 1547 to 1557, producing the city's Fontana del Nettuno and Fontana di Orione and on his departure leaving behind several followers such as Giuseppe Bottone. Martino Montanini also arrived in Messina in 1547, staying until 1561 and becoming Montorsoli's collaborator and successor as architect to the city's cathedral, sculpting several now-lost sculptures for it.

== Later 16th century ==
However much or little Sicily adhered to Renaissance forms, however late compared to the rest of Italy and however conditioned by pre-existing Sicilian artistic traditions, in the second half of the 16th century Sicily fully caught up with artistic developments in the rest of Italy and Rome in particular, taking on the complex mix of late Mannerism, classicism and Counter Reformation themes among others.

Artists and architects from the main cultural centres in the rest of Italy continued to emigrate to Sicily in this era, bringing new developments. That trend ended after this period and the main artists active in Sicily in the 17th century were Sicilians, often trained in Rome, a trend which had already begun in the second half of the 16th century.

=== Mannerist architecture ===
City councils on Sicily not only used Giovanni Angelo Montorsoli and particularly Andrea Calamech as sculptors but also as architects, introducing Mannerist classicism to Messina with now-lost works such as the Palazzo Reale and Calamech's Ospedale Maggiore.

An additional Sicilian interpreter of Mannerist architecture was Natale Masuccio (designer of buildings such as Messina's Monte di Pietà, whose typical rusticated-order doorway survives). Another was Michelangelo's pupil Jacopo Del Duca, initially active in Rome where he completed some of his master's projects, before returning to his native Sicily in 1588. He was active for ten years in Messina, where he succeeded Calamech as city architect and designed several buildings, almost all now destroyed by earthquakes but important for subsequent developments in Sicilian architecture.
