= Palazzo Marchesi, Palermo =

Palace in Palermo, Italy

Coordinates: 38.11318°N 13.36232°E

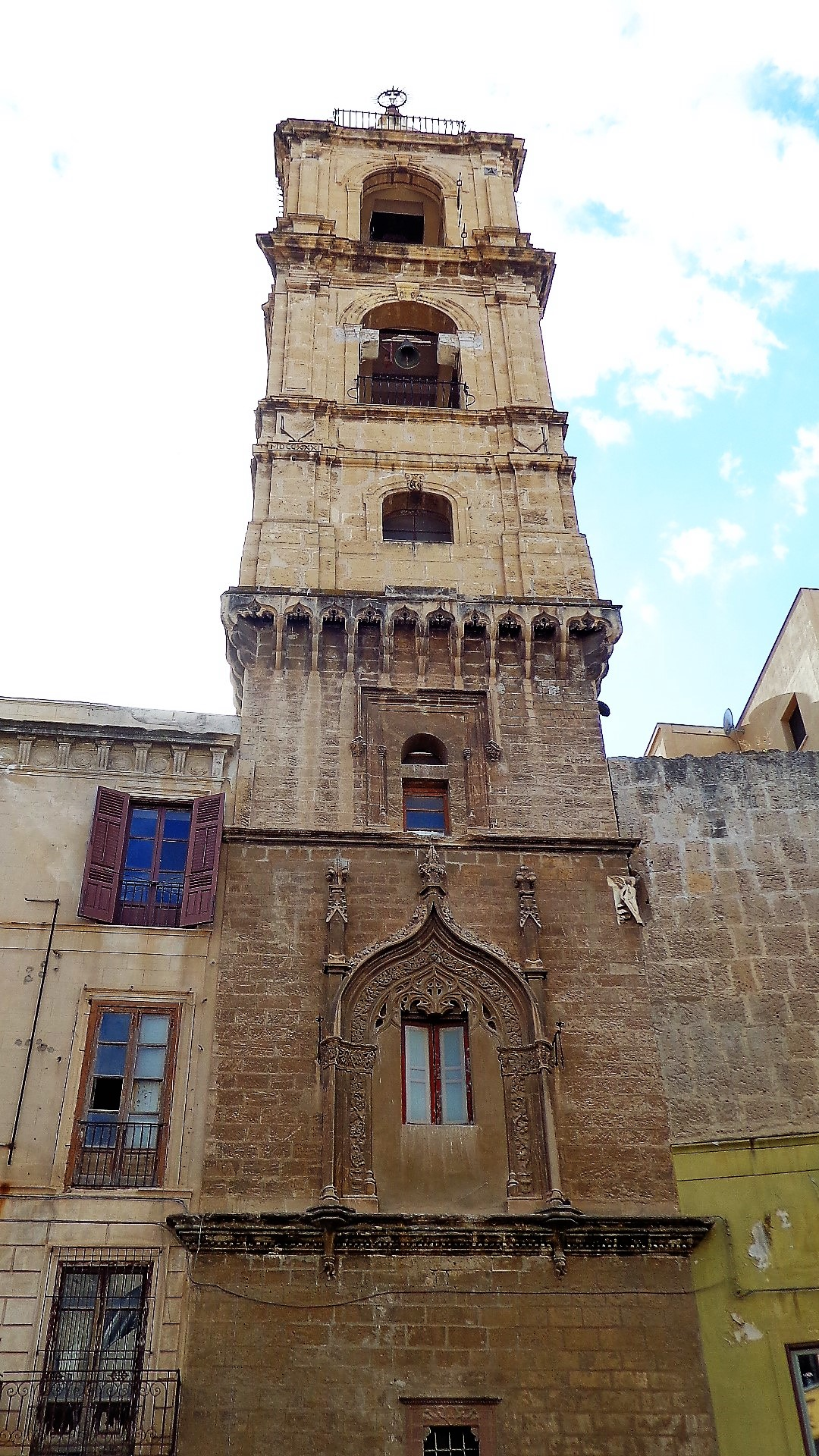
The tower, showing various stages of construction.

Palazzo Marchesi is a former aristocratic palace located on Via Santissimi Quaranta Martiri al Casalotto #14, adjacent to the Chiesa del Gesù for which this palace houses a bell-tower, in the ancient quarter of Albergheria, in central Palermo, region of Sicily, Italy. The building presently houses the rare book collection of the Biblioteca Comunale of Palermo.

== History ==
The present building is the result of many reconstructions and alterations over the centuries. A large palace was first erected by Antonio de Cusenza in the 15th century. The palace contains elements of this construction in the Gothic-style windows of the lower bell-tower, while the courtyard arches exemplify a more sober early-Renaissance style. By 1518, the Salvatore Marchesi, a prominent minister in the Aragonese Viceroy's service purchased the palace from the Cusenza family. The Marchesi family sold the palace in 1556 to the government, who installed the Holy Inquisition tribunal in the building for two years. In 1569, the palace, generally abandoned was ceded to the Jesuit order, who also ran the adjacent church. When the Jesuits were expelled from the kingdom in 1769, and the palace ultimately was again ceded to the government.

The bell-tower appears to have been added atop a tower present at the spot, that had only two stories. Underneath the courtyard was a large excavated room, that now has been identified as either or both a camera dello scirocco for cooling off in the summer or as a former mikveh belonging to the Jewish community.
