= Bust of a Princess =

Marble sculpture created in 1485

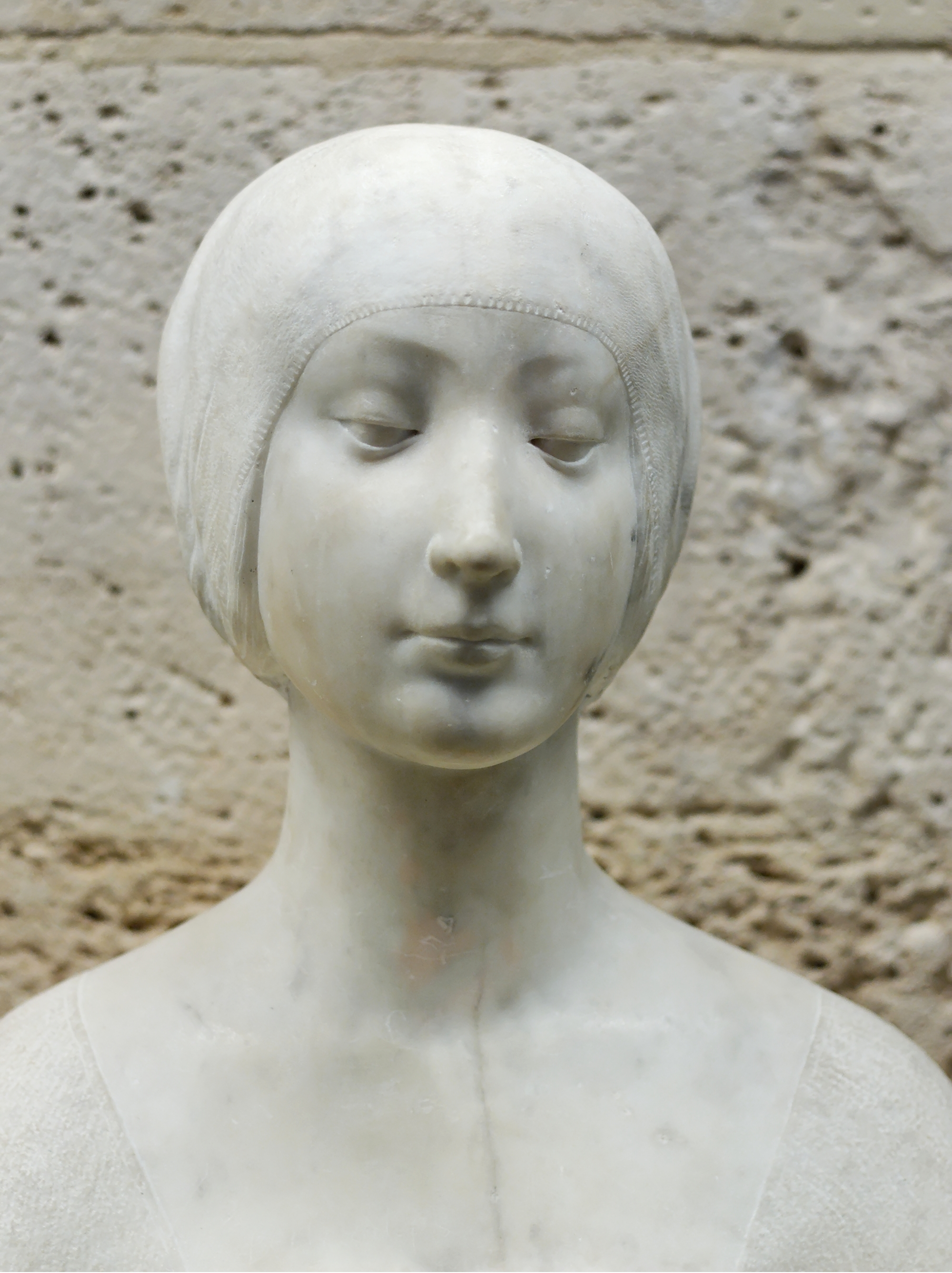

Bust of a Princess is a c.1485 marble sculpture (44 × 44 × 24 cm) by the Italian Renaissance sculptor Francesco Laurana. It was in the Condé family collection at château d'Écouen by 1793 and entered the Louvre in 1818, where it remains.

The events surrounding its creation are unknown, though its iconography is similar to the 1468 Portrait of Eleanor of Aragon, now in the palazzo Abatellis in Palermo. The Louvre work forms a perfect square, both 44 cm high and 44 cm deep - this principal of idealisation draws on the works of Piero della Francesca, which the sculptor may have seen in Urbino in his youth.
