= Church of the Gesù, Palermo =

Roman Catholic church in Sicily, Italy

Church of the Jesus
- Chiesa del Gesù (in Italian)
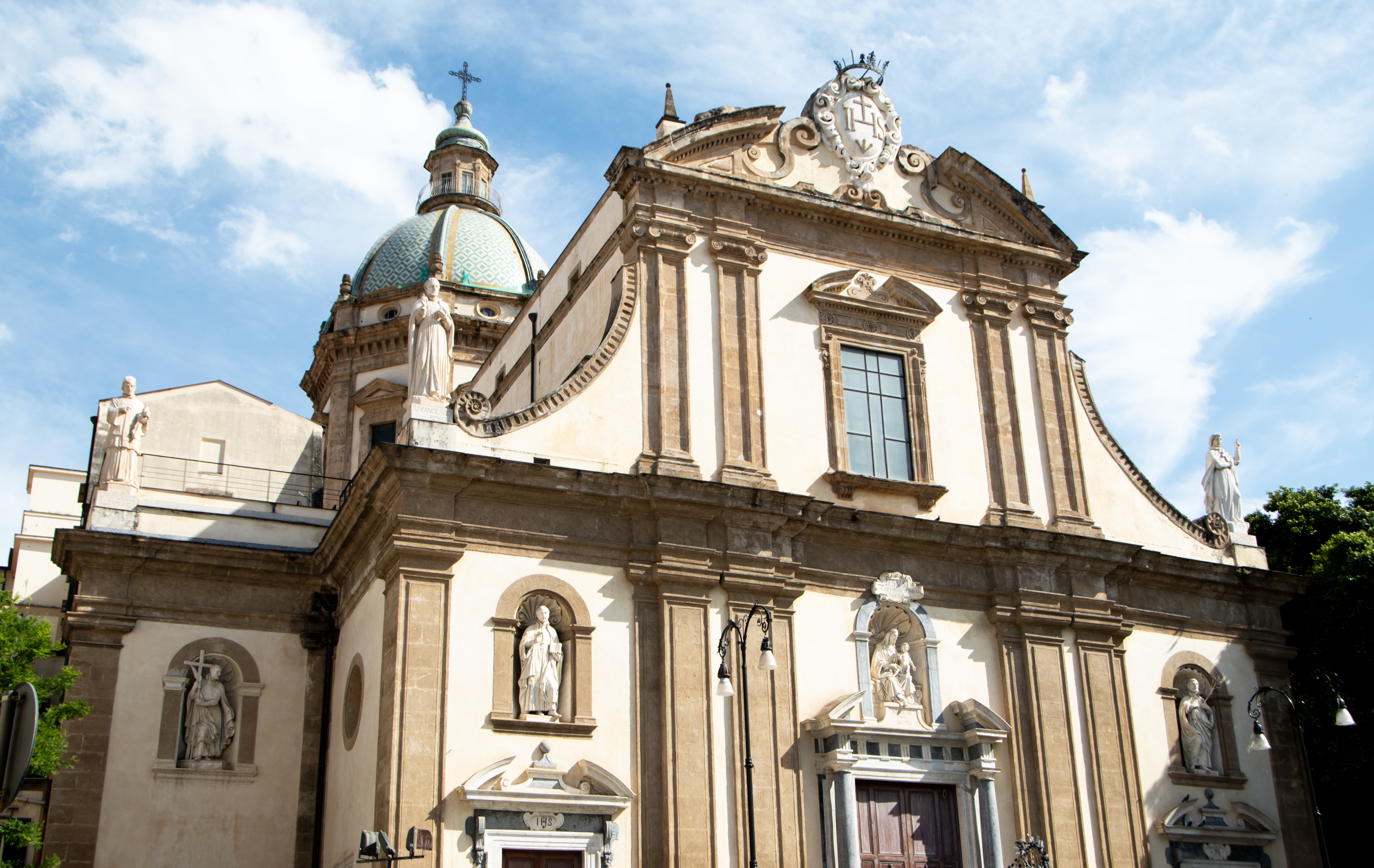
- Façade of the Church

Religion
- Affiliation: Roman Catholic
- Province: Archdiocese of Palermo
- Rite: Roman Rite

Location
- Location: Palermo, Italy
- Interactive map of Church of the Jesus
- Coordinates: 38°06′46.53″N 13°21′41.98″E

Architecture
- Style: Sicilian Baroque
- Groundbreaking: 1590
- Completed: 1636

The Church of the Gesù (Italian: Chiesa del Gesù, pronounced [ˈkjɛːza del dʒeˈzu]), known also as the Saint Mary of Jesus (Santa Maria di Gesù) or the Casa Professa, is a Baroque-style, Roman Catholic church established under the patronage of the Jesuit order, and located at Piazza Casa Professa 21 in Palermo, region of Sicily, Italy.

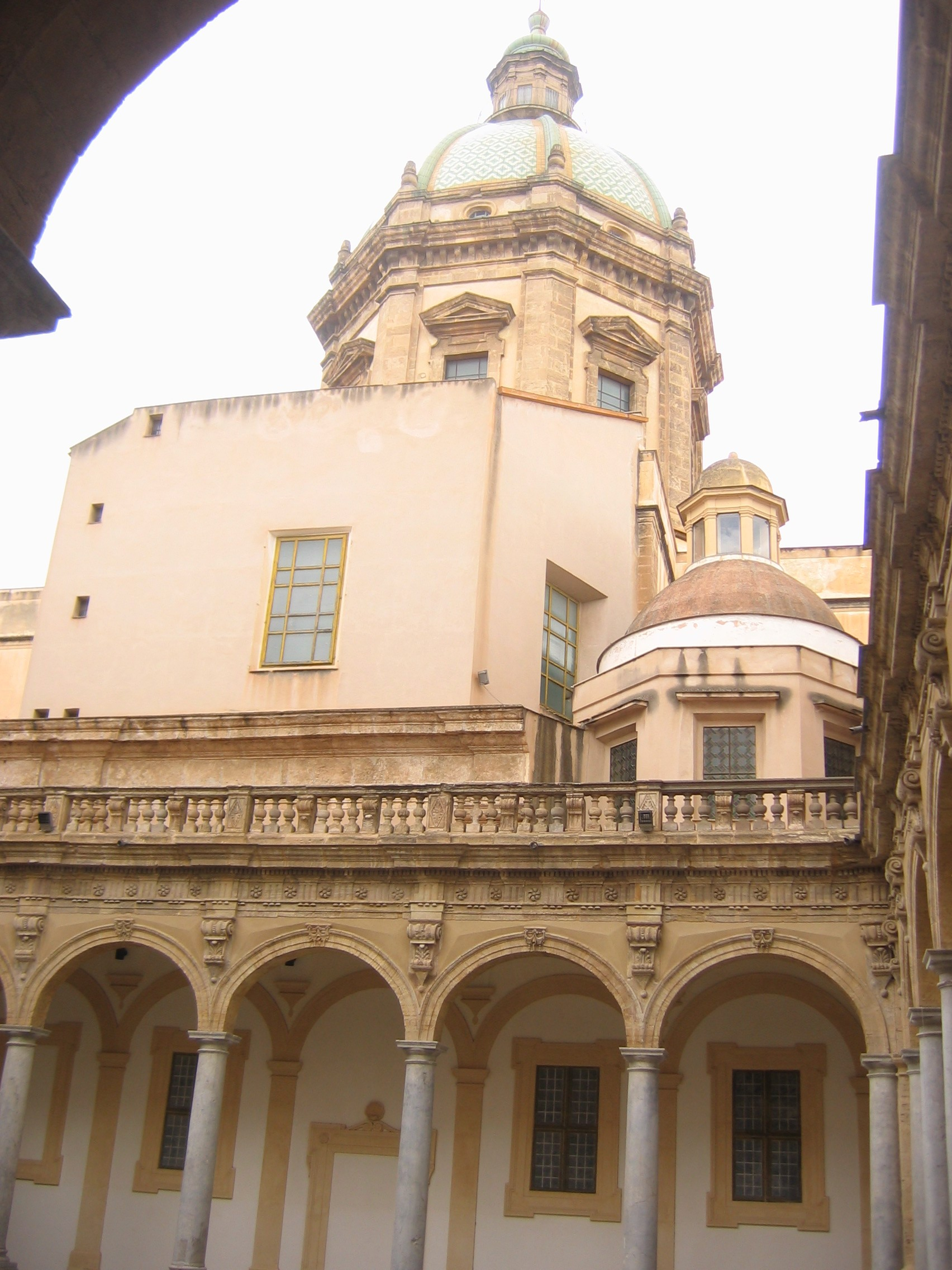
The church's dome and a transept, seen from the cloisters.

== History ==
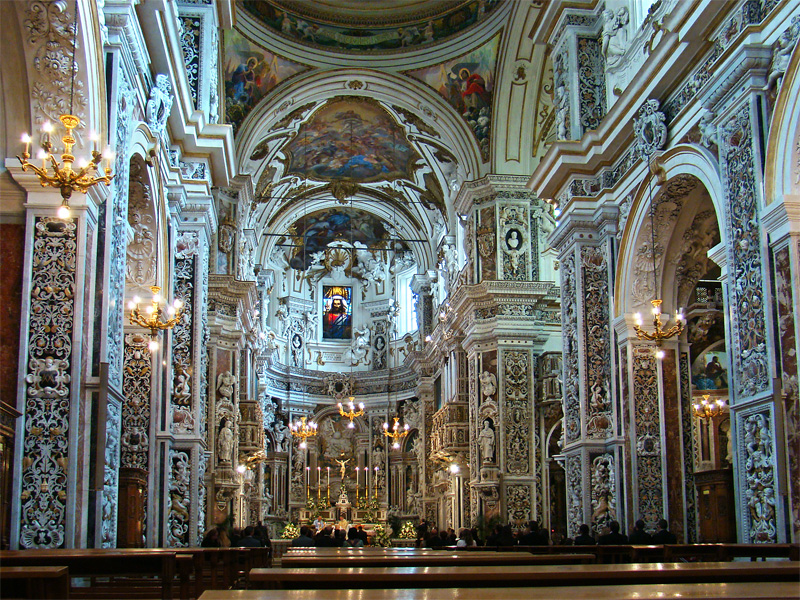
Interior of the church.

The Jesuits arrived in Palermo in 1549, and by the late 16th century began building a church adjacent to their professed house (casa professa) based on a design by the Jesuit architect Giovanni Tristano. The original design called for a single nave with large transepts and several side chapels, but the building was refurbished in starting in the early 17th century, to a more grandiose layout typical of Jesuit architecture. Natale Masuccio removed the chapels' dividing walls to add two side naves to the central one. The dome was completed in 1686.

The interior also received new decorations, starting in 1658 but continuing well into the next century. This baroque decor included marble bas-reliefs on the tribuna depicting the Adoration of the Shepherds (1710–14) and Adoration of the Magi (1719–21), by Gioacchino Vitagliano, after designs attributed to Giacomo Serpotta - both reliefs survive. A fresco of the Adoration of the Magi was also added to the walls of the second side-chapel to the right by Antonino Grano in the 1720s. The church also contains a relief of the Glory of St Luke by Ignazio Marabitti. Much of the interior stucco decoration was completed by Procopio Serpotta, son of Giacomo.

In 1892, cavaliere Salvatore Di Pietro, philanthropist, former rector of the Casa Professa, prefect of studies at the seminary, and member of the Theological College, of the Academy of Sciences, letters and arts and of the Accademia di storia patria, convinced in 1888 the minister of public education, Paolo Boselli, to decree the church a national monument.

In 1943, during the Second World War, a bomb collapsed the church's dome, destroying most of the surrounding walls and most of the wall paintings in the chancel and transepts. These frescoes were replaced during two years' restoration work, after which the church reopened on 24 February 2009 with a solemn mass presided over by Paolo Romeo, archbishop of Palermo, and attended by several Jesuits and civil and military officials.

== Architecture ==
The facade is divided into two sections by a cornice. In the lower part there are three portals, above are niches with statues of St Ignatius of Loyola, a Madonna with Child and Francis Xavier. The upper section is divided by pilasters and framed on both sides with corbels and statues of saints. The facade is surmounted by a curved-segmented gable and the Jesuit emblem. Masucci originally planned belfries, but these were not completed, and the current 18th-century campanile was built on the adjacent Palazzo Marchesi. Behind the church, the Jesuit chapter houses the collection of rare books of the Biblioteca comunale di Palermo.

The layout is in the shape of a Latin cross. The nave is 72.10 m long, 42.65 m wide and 70 m high and is decorated with polychrome marbles, stucco and frescoes. In particular, the marble reliefs with their figural and ornamental motifs on the pillars and the marble mosaics are unique. The rebuilt structure has a double dome and stained glass windows.

== Decorations (selected) ==
Decorations by:

- Pietro Novelli
- Vito D'Anna (fresco depicting scenes from the life of Saint Rosalia)

== See also ==
- 16th-century Western domes

== Gallery ==
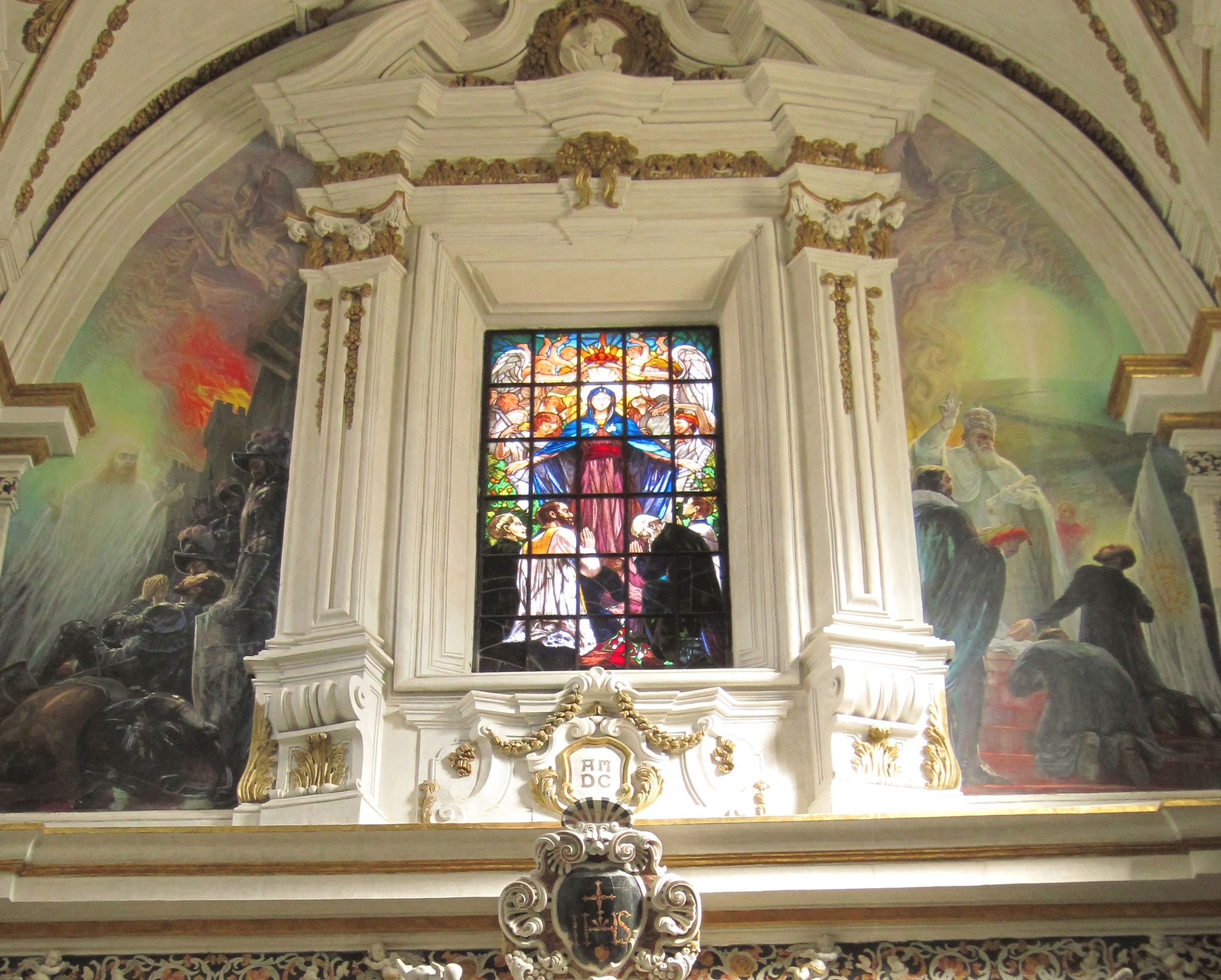
Stained glass and frescoes above main entrance.

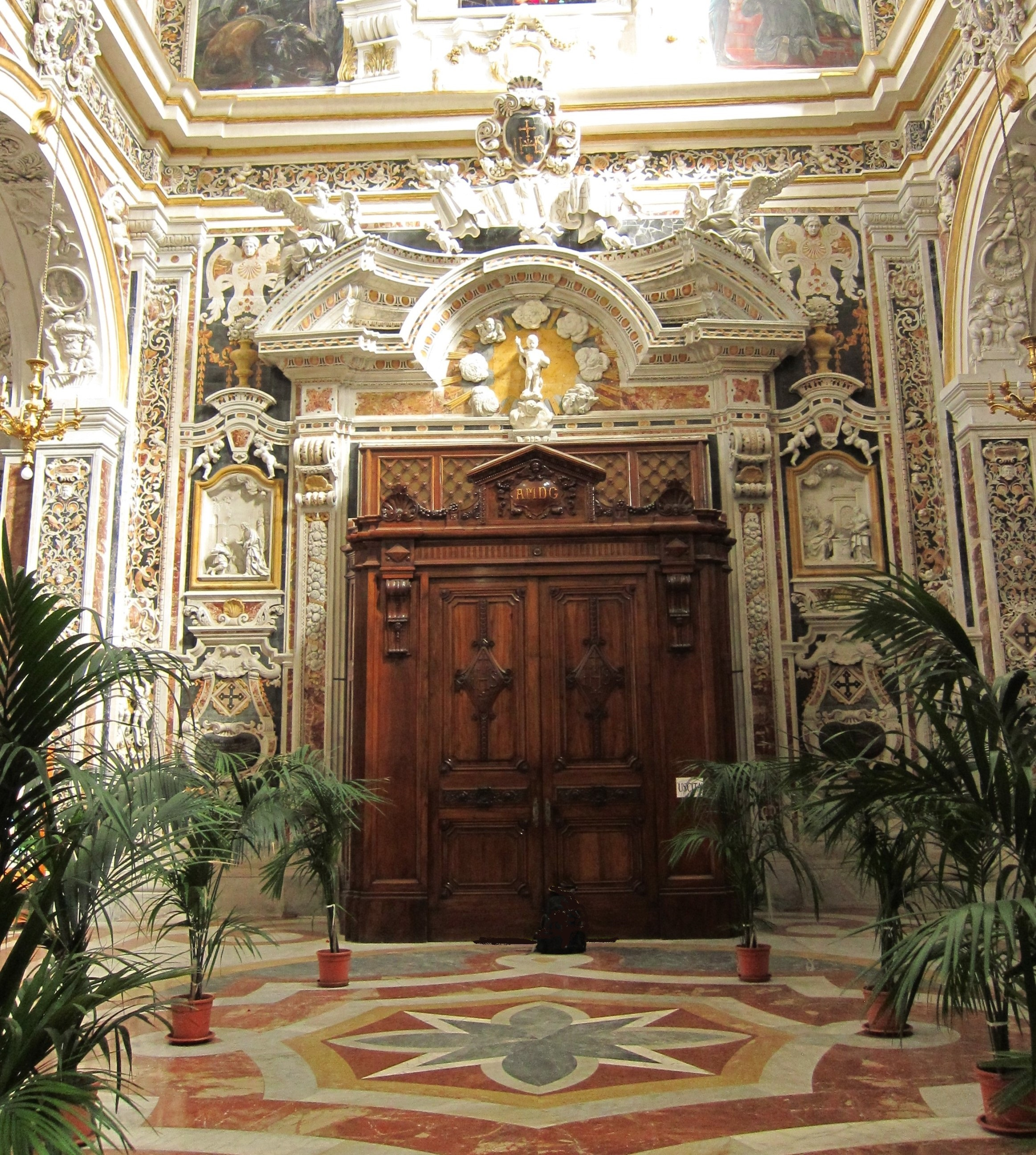
Main entrance surrounded by marble carvings.

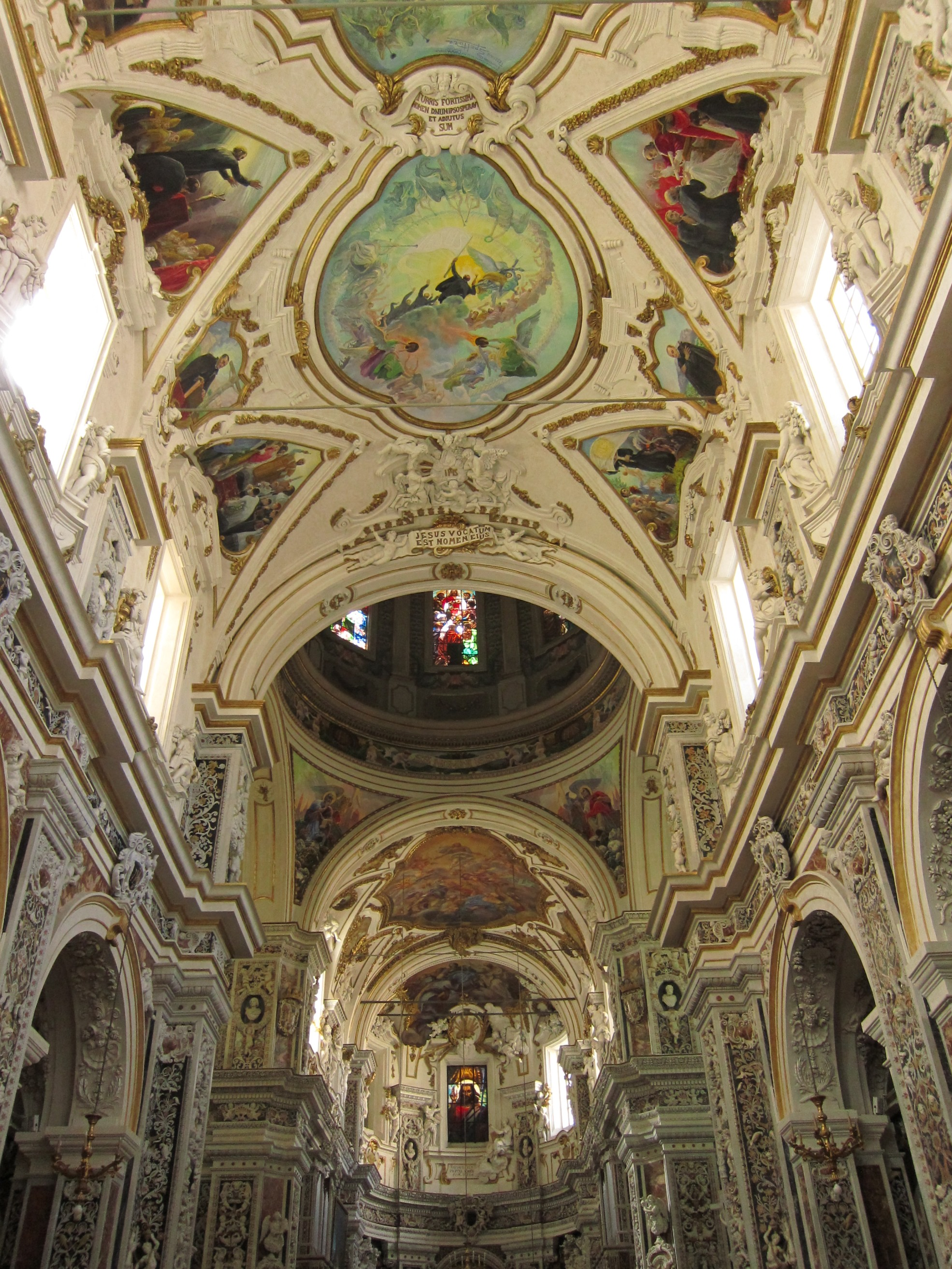
Ceiling of nave, interior of dome with stained glasse, ceiling of chancel/apse, daylight through clerestory windows

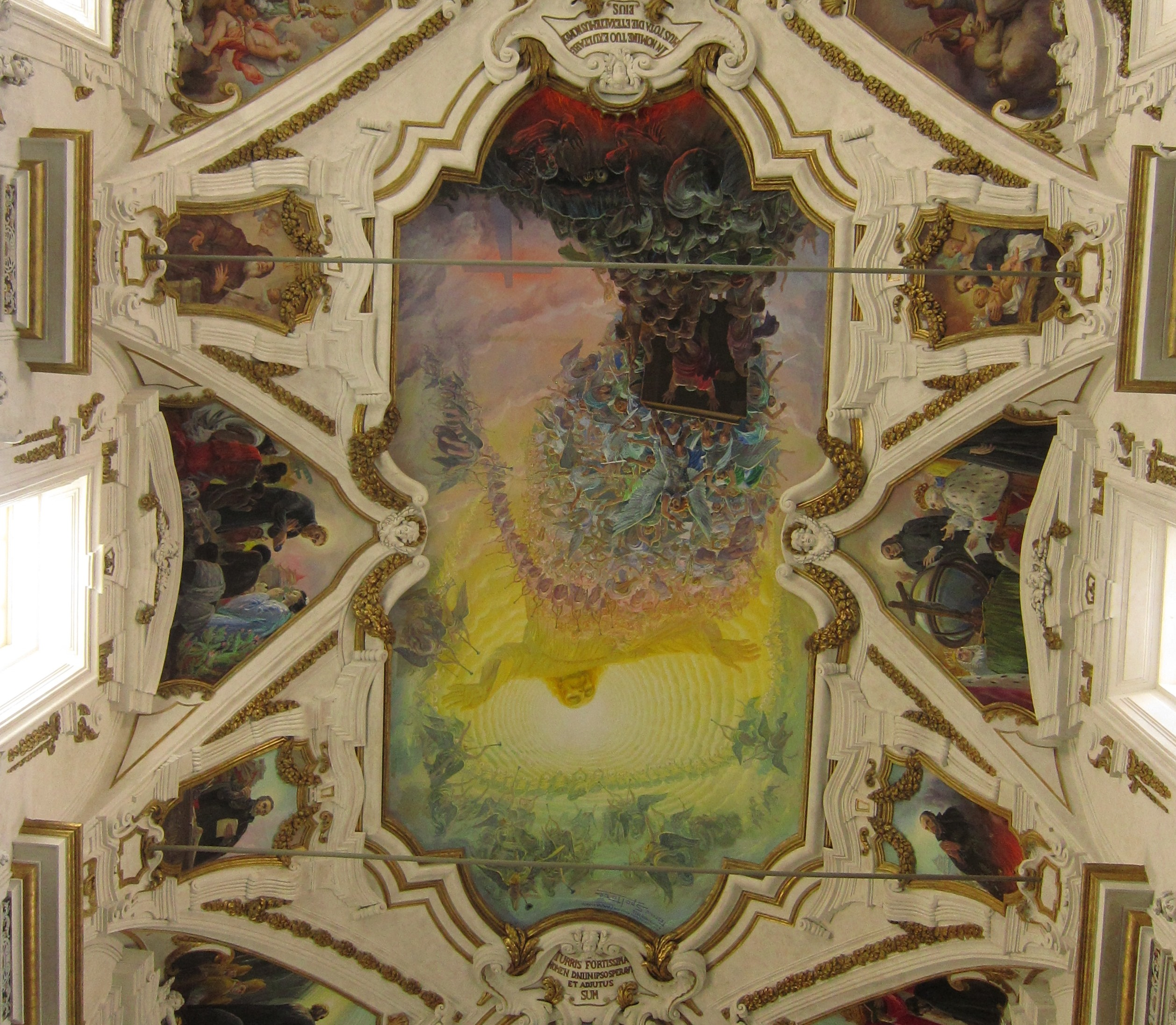
Ceiling frescoes seen straight upwards.

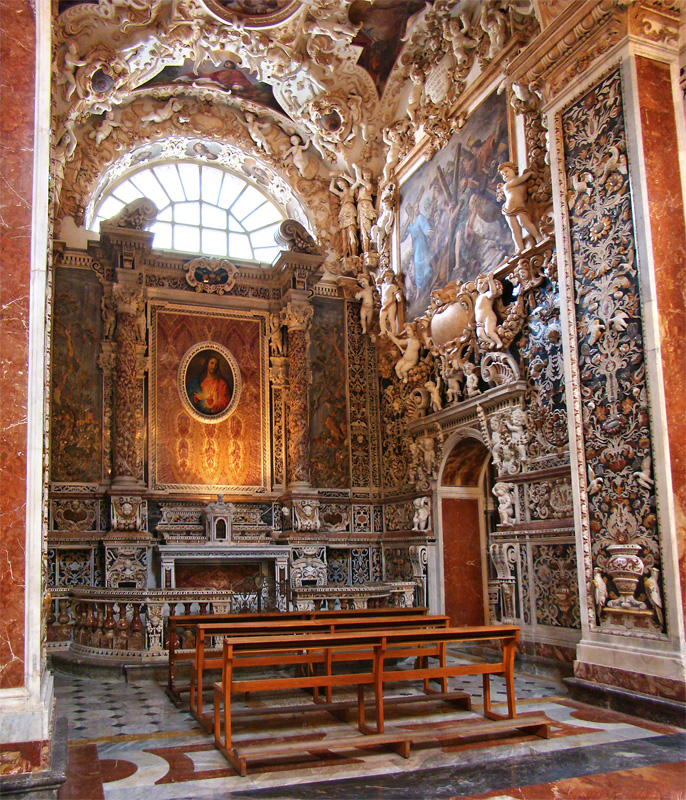
Lateral chapel

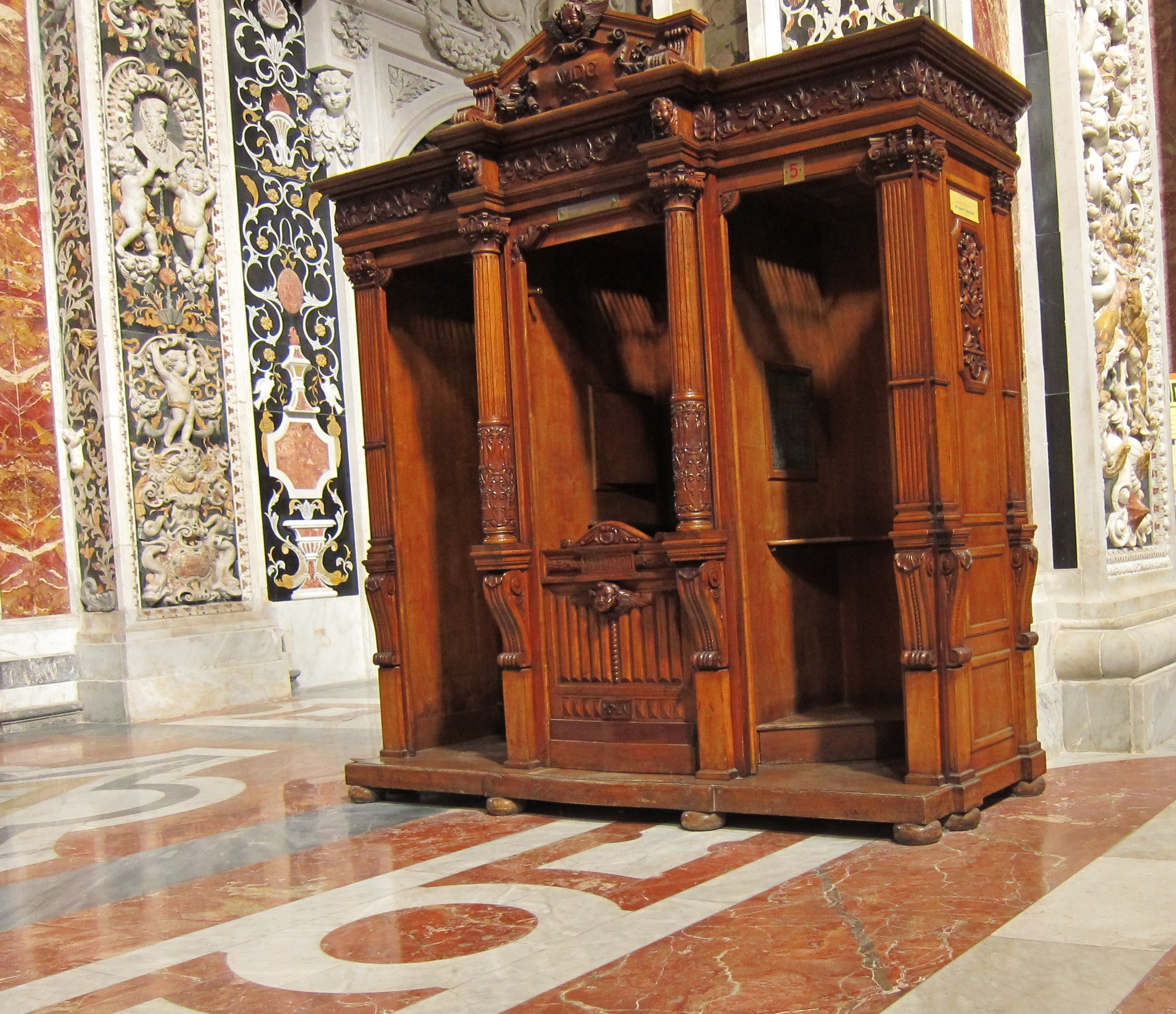
Confessional number 5

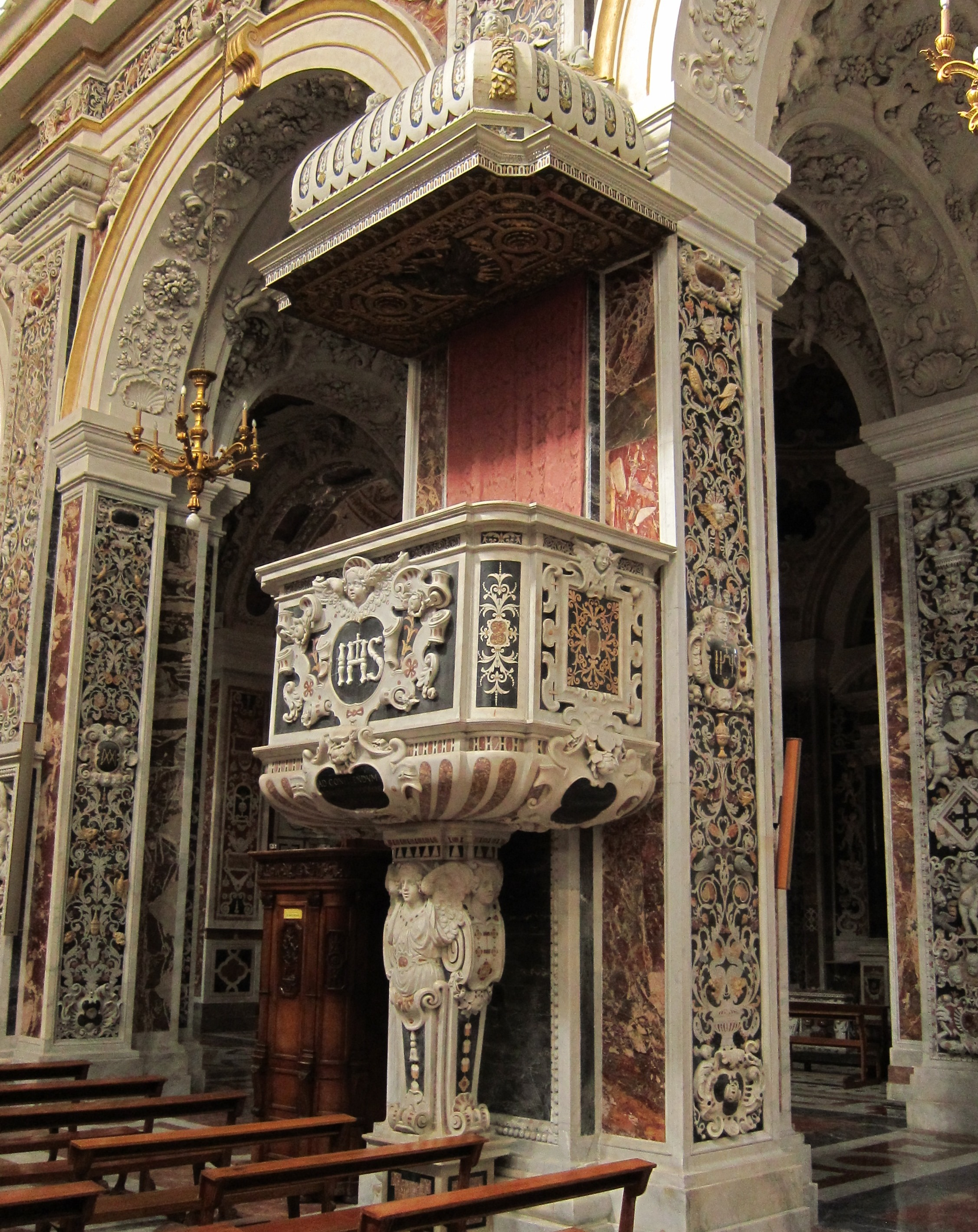
Pulpit

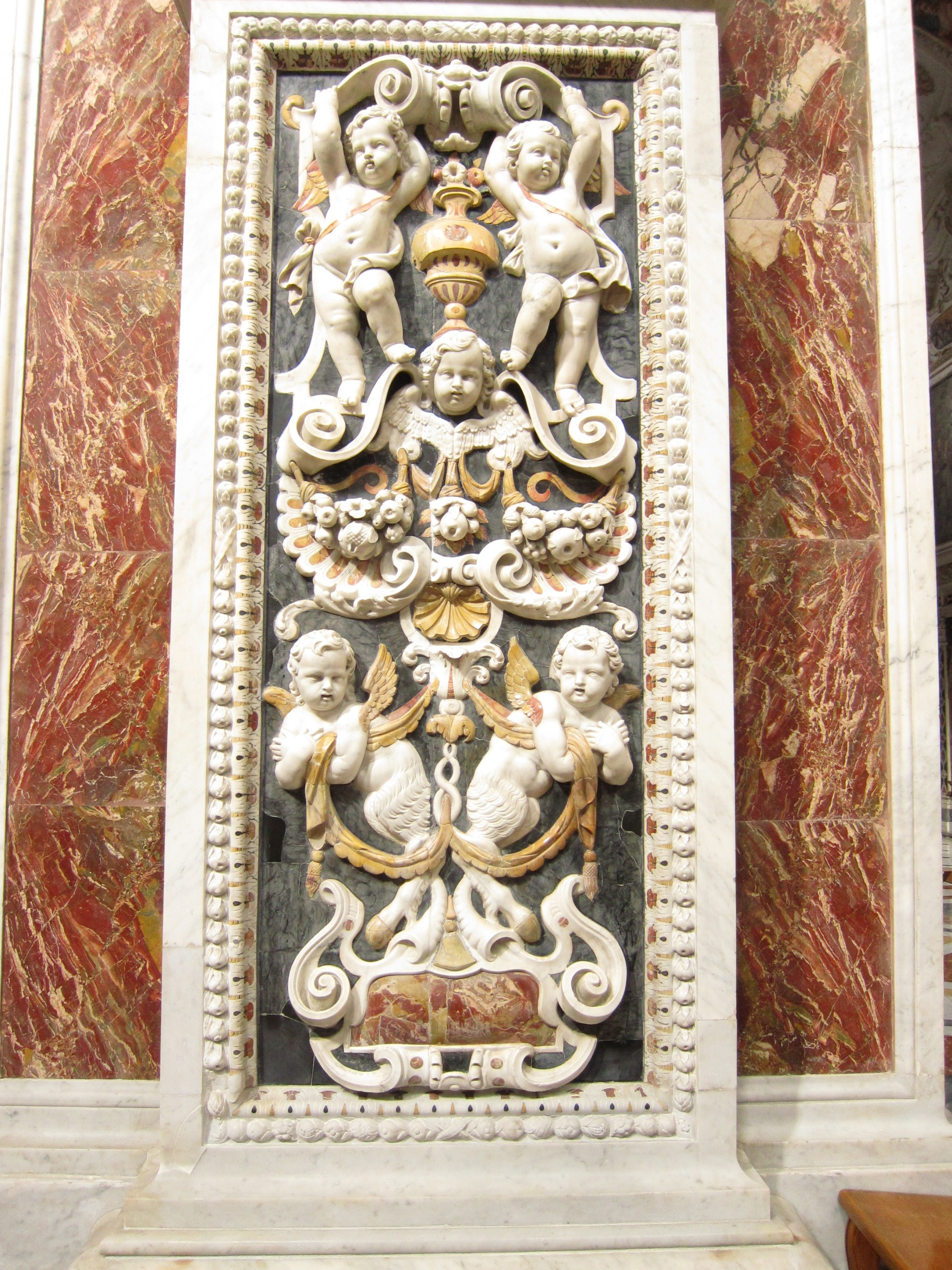
Marble carving, detail

== Bibliography ==
- (in Italian) G. Filiti S.J., La Chiesa della Casa Professa della Compagnia di Gesù in Palermo, Bondì Palermo, 1906.
- (in Italian) D. Garstang, Giacomo Serpotta and the Stuccatori of Palermo, 1560-1790, A.Zwemmer Ltd. London 1984.
- (in Italian) S. Barcellona, Gli scultori del Cassaro, Ingrana, Palermo 1971, riedito in Scritti d’arte: studi e interventi sulla cultura artistica in Sicilia, edited by G. Bongiovanni, Brotto, Palermo 1992.
- (in Italian) S. Piazza, I marmi mischi delle chiese di Palermo, Sellerio, Palermo 1992, (in part. pp. 37–44).
- (in Italian) Maria Carla Ruggieri Tricoli, Costruire Gerusalemme. Il complesso gesuitico della Casa Professa di Palermo dalla storia al museo, Ed. Lybra, Milano 2001.
- (in Italian) Luca Mansueto, I pilastri absidali della Chiesa del Gesù di Casa Professa in Palermo, in Karta, anno I (2006), num.4, pp. 10–11.
