= Alfonso Franco =

Italian painter

Alfonso Franco (1466–1524), was an Italian painter from Messina, Sicily, active during the Italian Renaissance.

He was a pupil of Jacobello da Antonello, son of Antonello da Messina. He painted a Deposition for the church of San Francesco di Paola in Messina; and a Dispute of Jesus at the Temple for the church of Sant'Agostino. He died of the plague in 1524.
