= Palazzo del Monte di Pietà (Messina) =

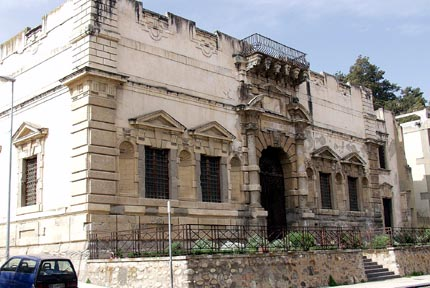
- Palazzo del Monte di Pietà
- Interactive map of the Palazzo del Monte di Pietà area

General information
- Status: Partially intact
- Type: Palace
- Architectural style: Mannerist
- Location: Messina, Sicily, Italy
- Coordinates: 38°11′41″N 15°33′10″E
- Construction started: 1616
- Renovated: 1741

Technical details
- Floor count: 2

Design and construction
- Architect: Natale Masuccio

Renovating team
- Architect: Antonino Basile

The Palazzo del Monte di Pietà is a palace in Messina, Sicily, located on via XXIV Maggio (formerly "via dei Monasteri"). It was built in 1616 for the Arciconfraternita degli Azzurri to designs of Natale Masuccio. The building was severely damaged during the earthquake of 1908.

== History ==
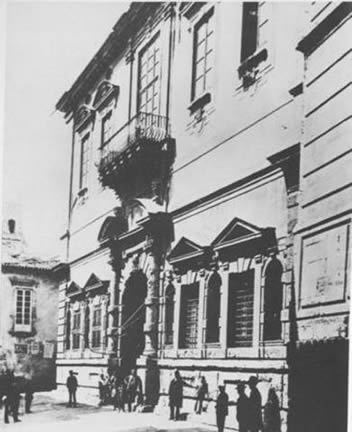
The Palazzo del Monte di Pietà before the earthquake of 1908

The mount of piety of Messina was founded in 1581 by the Arciconfraternita degli Azzurri, and it was built on the ruins of a church dedicated to St. Basil. The present building began to be built in 1616 to designs of the architect Natale Masuccio. The structure originally had a single floor.

The building was modified in 1741 with the addition of a first floor, a bell tower and a staircase. These were built to designs of the architect Antonino Basile. A fountain decorated with a statue of Abundance, which was the work of Ignazio Buceti, was built in the middle of the staircase.

The structure was damaged during the earthquake of 1783 and that of 1908. The building's upper floor was largely destroyed during the latter earthquake. The structure was further damaged by World War II bombings.

Restoration of the building began in 1979, and it is now used for cultural purposes.

== Architecture ==
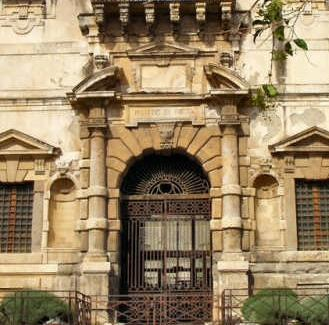
Portal of the Palazzo del Monte di Pietà

The Palazzo del Monte di Pietà is built in the Mannerist style. The ground floor has a central rusticated portal topped by a broken pediment, flanked by two windows on each side. The windows are topped by triangular pediments, and they are separated by niches.

The first floor of the building, which was constructed in the 18th century, had an open balcony flanked by two windows on each side. The balcony and the lower parts of the windows can still be seen, but the rest of the floor was destroyed in the 1908 earthquake.

The building contains a large vaulted hall which opens into a courtyard. This leads to the 18th-century monumental staircase, leading to the Church of Santa Maria della Pietà. Only part of the façade of the church has survived; the building itself was destroyed during the 1908 earthquake.

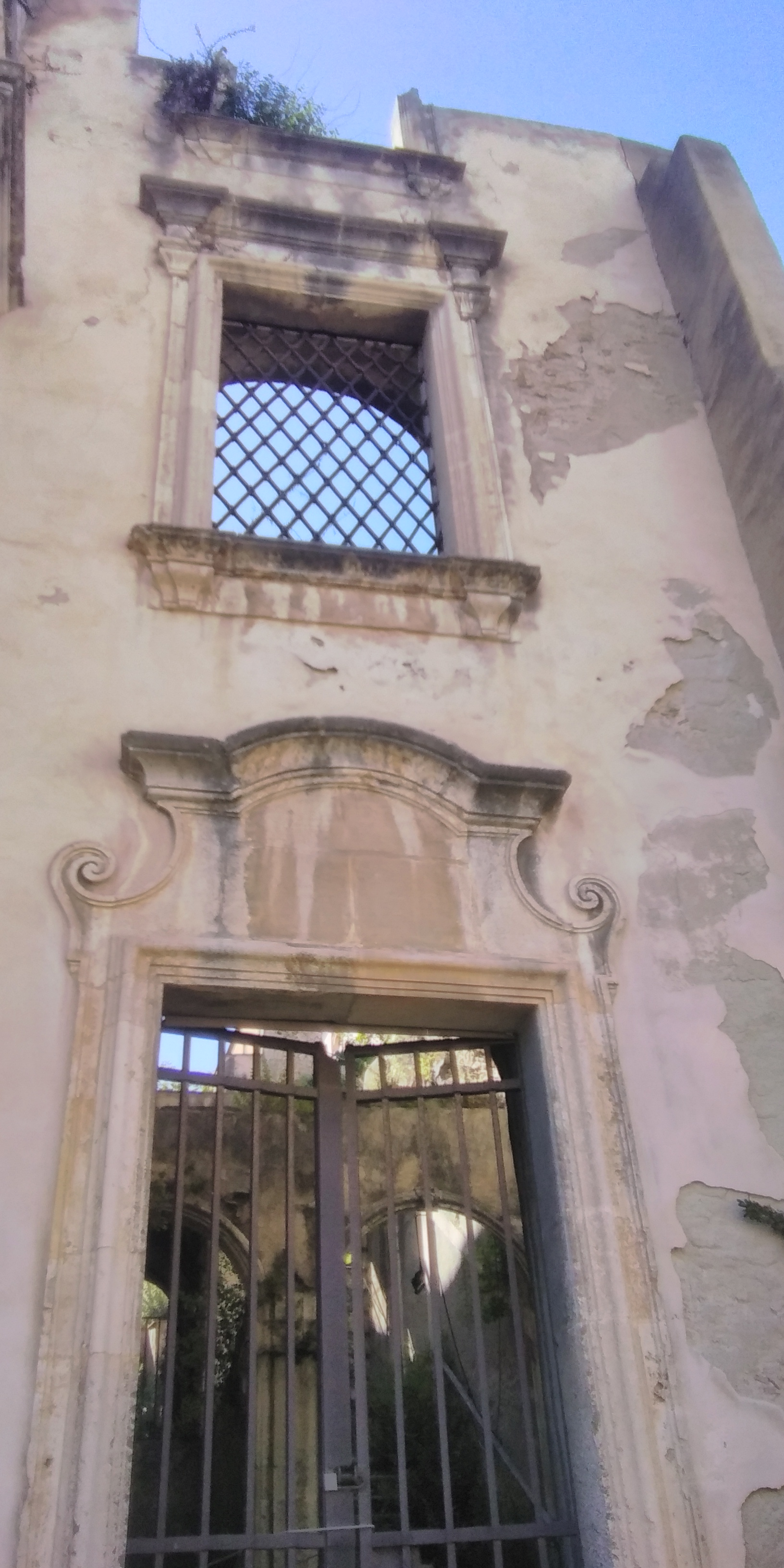
Surviving section of the campanile. Its top was destroyed in the 1908 earthquake

== See also ==
- List of banks in Italy
