= Portrait of Eleanor of Aragon =

1468 sculpture by Francesco Laurana

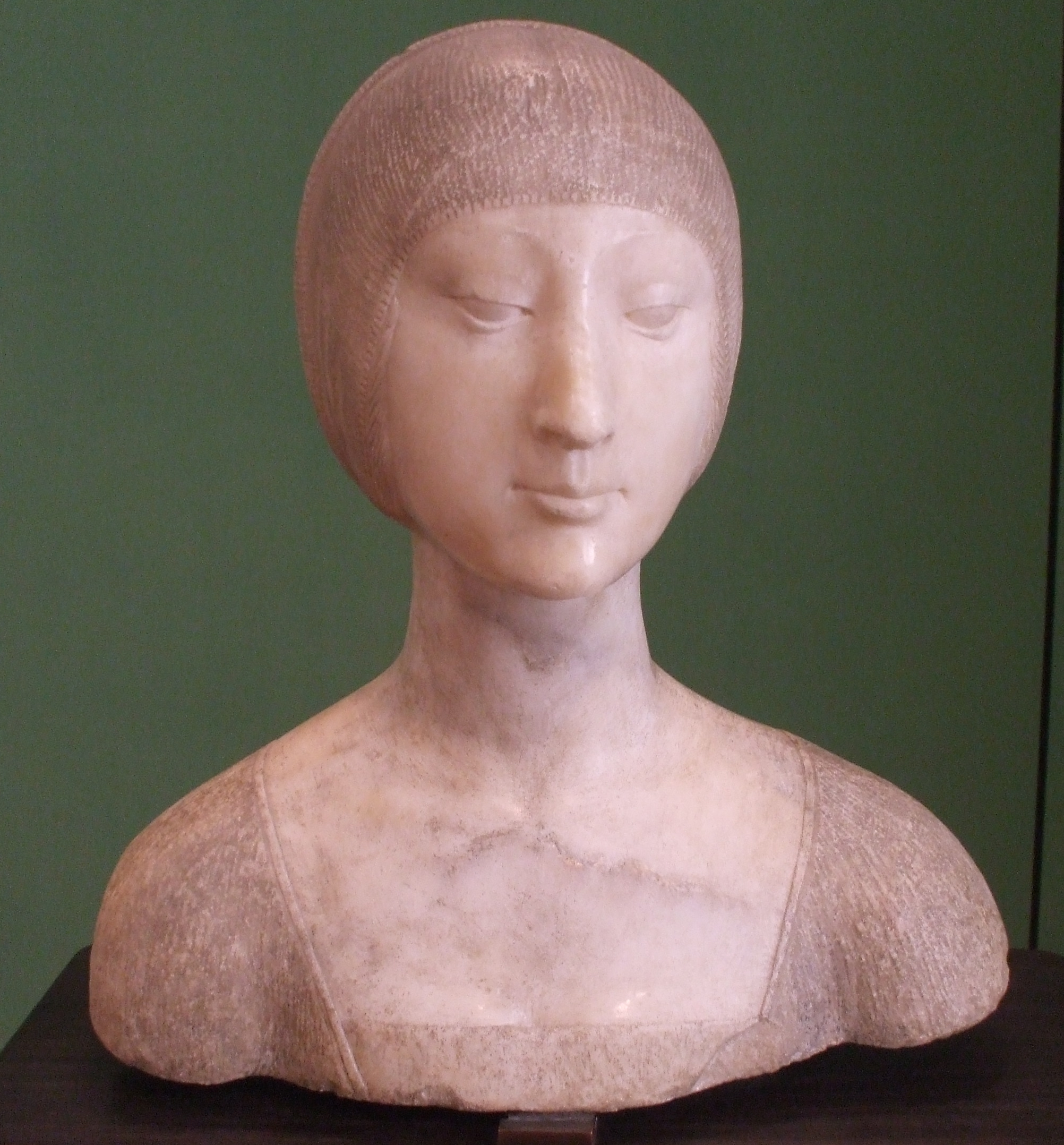
- Artist: Francesco Laurana
- Year: 1468
- Medium: Marble
- Subject: Eleanor of Aragon
- Location: Palazzo Abatellis, Palermo

Portrait of Eleanor of Aragon is a marble sculpture of Eleanor of Aragon, originally carved by Francesco Laurana in 1468 for her tomb but now in the Palazzo Abatellis in Palermo. It is very iconographically similar to Bust of a Princess (Louvre).

== Bibliography (in Italian) ==
- David Alberto Murolo; Storie della Vrana: destini incrociati tra arte e guerra: Luciano e Francesco Laurana, Giovanni Vrana, Yusuf Maskovic, REMEL, Ancona, 2016 -
- Pierluigi De Vecchi ed Elda Cerchiari, I tempi dell'arte, volume 2, Bompiani, Milano 1999. ISBN 88-451-7212-0
