= Natale Masuccio =

Italian architect and Jesuit (between 1561 and 1568–1619)

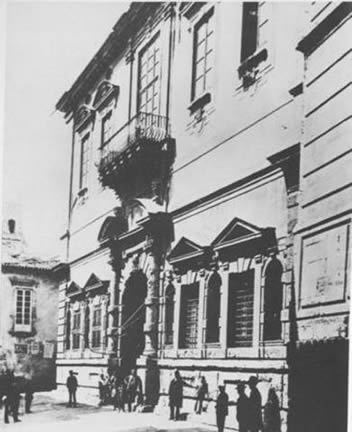

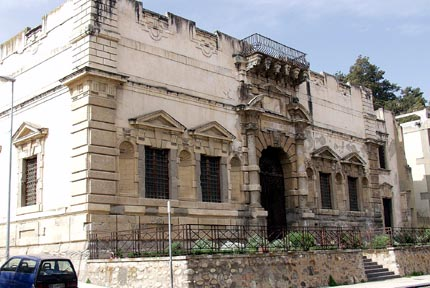
The Palazzo del Monte di Pietà in Messina, which was designed by Masuccio in 1616, before (top) and after (bottom) the earthquake of 1908

Natale Masuccio (between 1561 and 1568 – August 1619), also known as Mesuccio or Tomasucci, was an Italian architect and Jesuit. He is regarded as one of the most important architects in Sicily during the transition between Mannerism and Baroque.

== Life and career ==
Masuccio was born in Messina sometime between 1561 and 1568. There is no documentation about his early life and initial training as an architect. He entered the Jesuit Order in 1580 and was sent to Rome to study architecture in 1586 and again in 1597–99. He probably started his architectural studies in Messina, since at the time of his call at the headquarters of the order he already had a mature age. Masuccio was therefore able to launch his training in a vibrant cultural scene, and he may have been in contact with Andrea Calamech, who introduced Tuscan mannerism which would later influence the work of Masuccio. He was also influenced by the style of Giacomo del Duca, who was active in Messina in the 1590s.

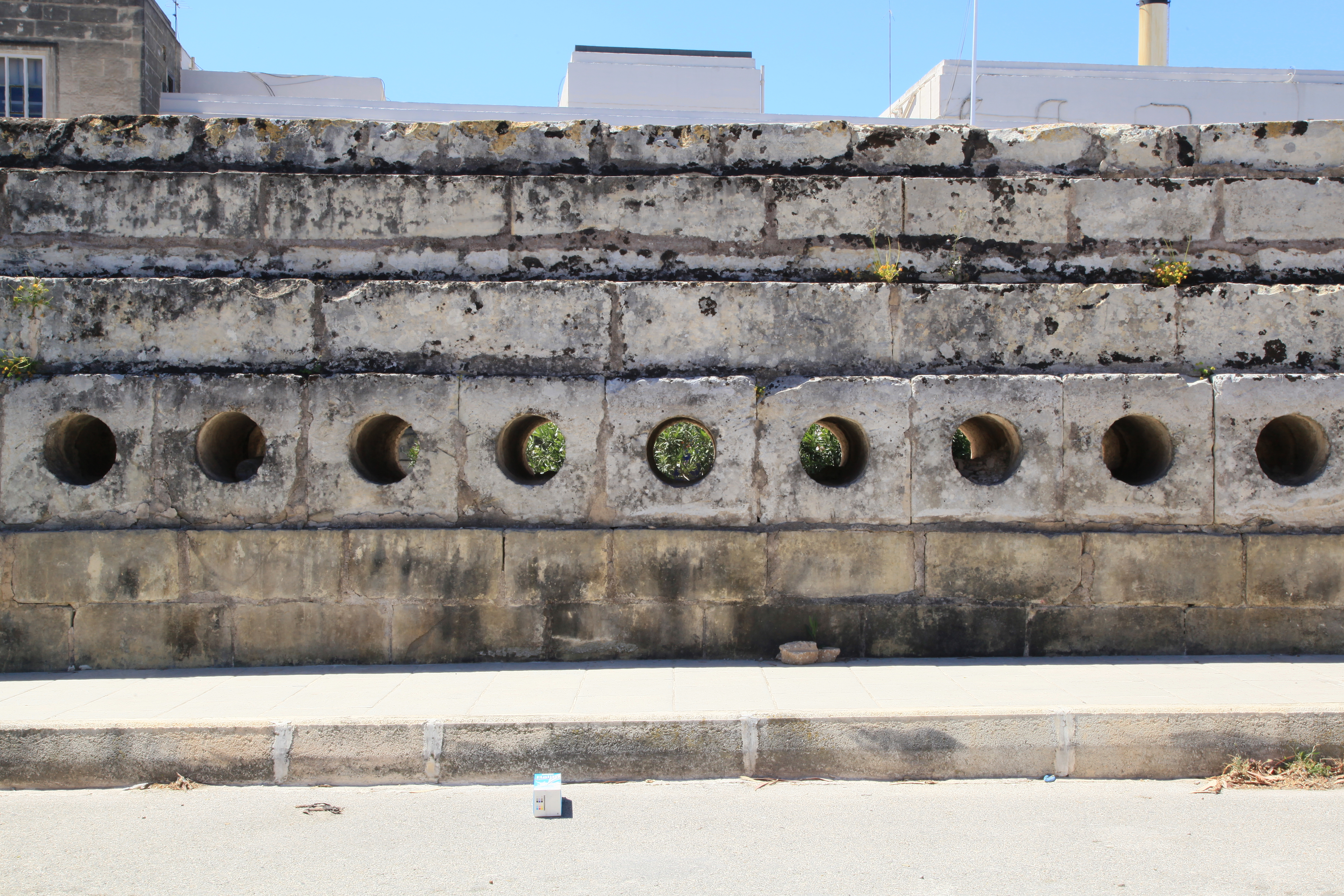
The Wignacourt Aqueduct in Malta

In Rome, Masuccio consolidated his training, was introduced to the early Baroque style and made contact with Giacomo della Porta and other personalities. During his return to Sicily, he was captured by pirates but was released when the ship was captured by the Order of St. John. He was welcomed in Malta by Grand Master Alof de Wignacourt, and was involved in the early stages of the construction of the Wignacourt Aqueduct between 1610 and 1612, when he left the island after being unable to solve the problem of how water would flow at Attard along depressions in the ground.

On his return to Sicily, he worked on the design and construction of works of the Jesuits, and was the first architect of the Jesuit Province of Sicily. He made significant alterations to the Church of the Gesù in Palermo in 1603, and around the same time he designed the Jesuit Novitiate in the same city. He also designed the Jesuit Church and College in Messina, and several other buildings in Trapani, Sciacca and elsewhere in Sicily.

He was expelled from the Jesuit Order in 1616, after a violent argument with the Provincial Father. He later became the architect of the Senato di Messina, who had already commissioned him to build an aqueduct in 1611. In 1616, he designed the Palazzo del Monte di Pietà, which is his best-known work.

Most of his works in Messina were destroyed during the earthquake of 1908.

== Works ==
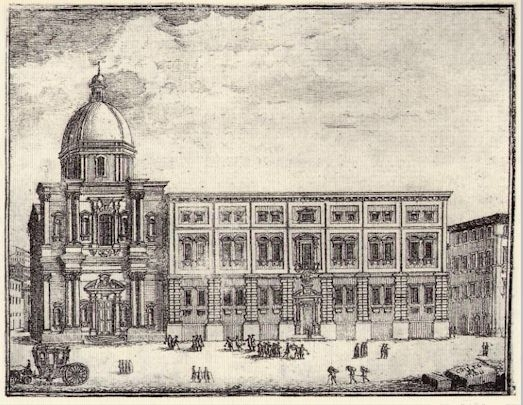
College and Jesuit Church in Messina

Works by Masuccio include:

- Alterations to the Church of the Gesù in Palermo (1603)
- Jesuit Novitiate in Palermo (c. 1603) – largely destroyed
- Jesuit Church and College in Messina (1604) – destroyed
- Early stages of the Wignacourt Aqueduct in Malta (1610–12)
- Jesuit College in Noto (1611) – in ruins since the 1693 Sicily earthquake
- Jesuit Complex in Sciacca (1613–17, attributed)
- Jesuit Church and College in Trapani (1614, attributed)
- Palazzo del Monte di Pietà in Messina (1616) – in ruins since the 1908 Messina earthquake
