= Jacobello da Messina =

Italian painter

Jacopo de Antonio; also called Jacobello Antonello, Jacobello da Messina, or Iacobello di Antonello (c. 1456 – after 1482), was an Italian painter from Messina, Sicily, active during the Renaissance. He was the son of Antonello da Messina. Jacobello may be the same as Pino da Messina.

== Biography ==
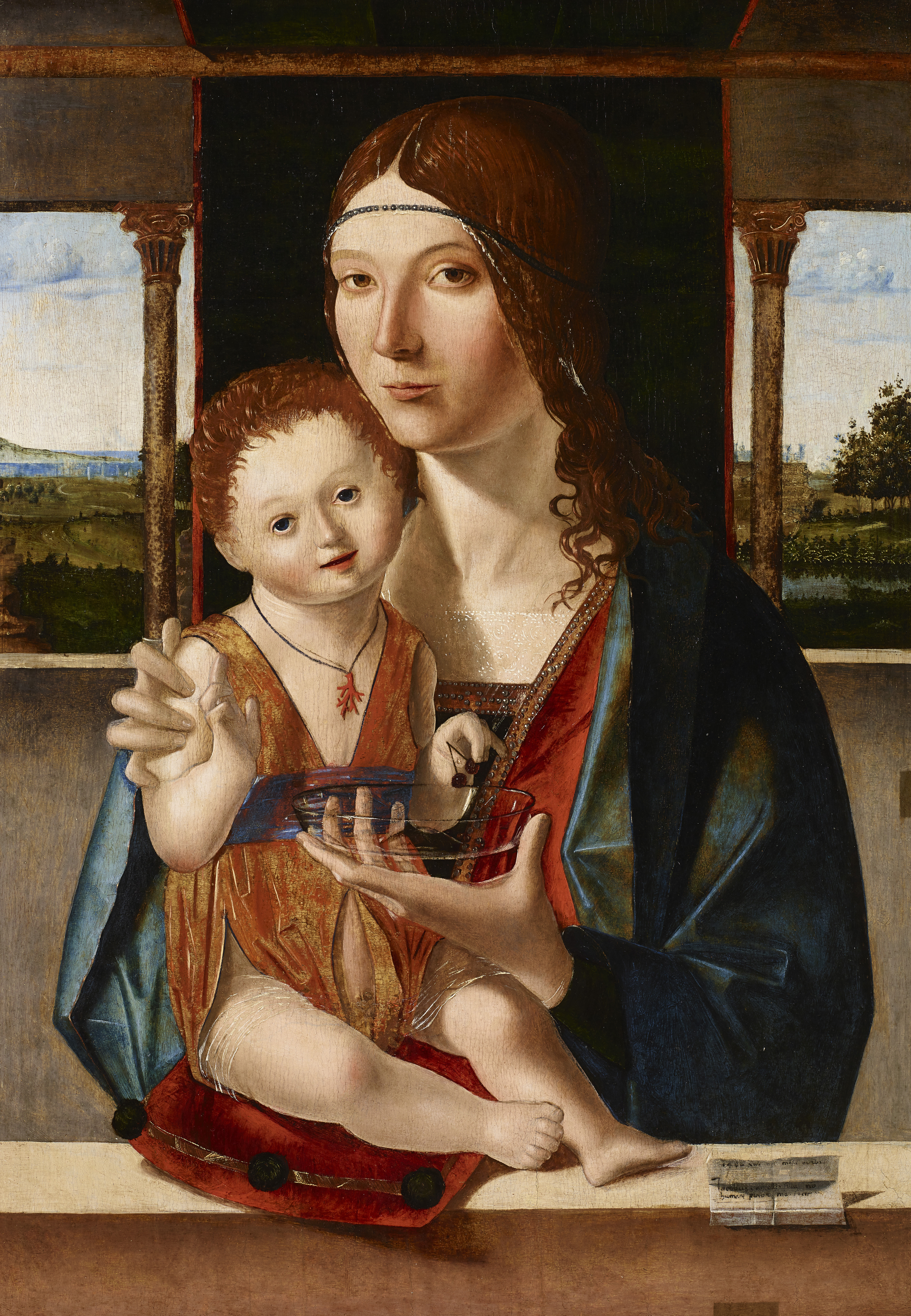
Madonna and Child, dated 1480, in the Accademia Carrara, Bergamo

The son of the painter Antonello da Messina, Jacobello was probably born at Messina some time before 1457, and almost certainly traveled to Venice with his father during the 1460s and 1470s. He was also active in Naples and is mentioned in his father's will of 1479. Few works are attributed to him. His only signed and dated work to survive is a Madonna and Child, dated 1480, in the Accademia Carrara at Bergamo.

Alfonso Franco of Messina is said to have been his pupil.
