= San Francesco d'Assisi, Palermo =

Church in Sicily, Italy

Church of Saint Francis of Assisi
- Chiesa di San Francesco d'Assisi (in Italian)
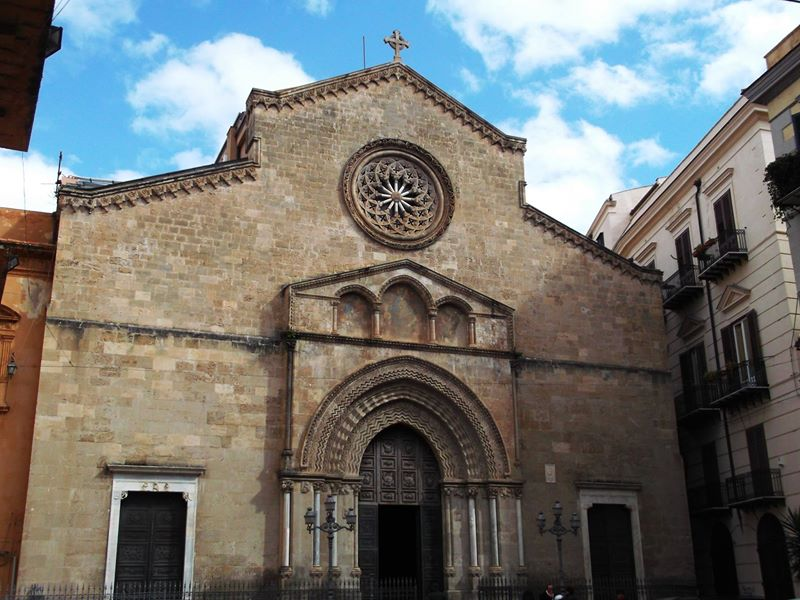
- Façade of the Church of Saint Francis

Religion
- Affiliation: Roman Catholic
- Province: Archdiocese of Palermo
- Rite: Roman Rite

Location
- Location: Palermo, Italy
- Interactive map of Church of Saint Francis of Assisi
- Coordinates: 38°06′59.44″N 13°21′59.32″E

Architecture
- Style: Gothic, Sicilian Baroque
- Groundbreaking: 13th century

Website
- Official site

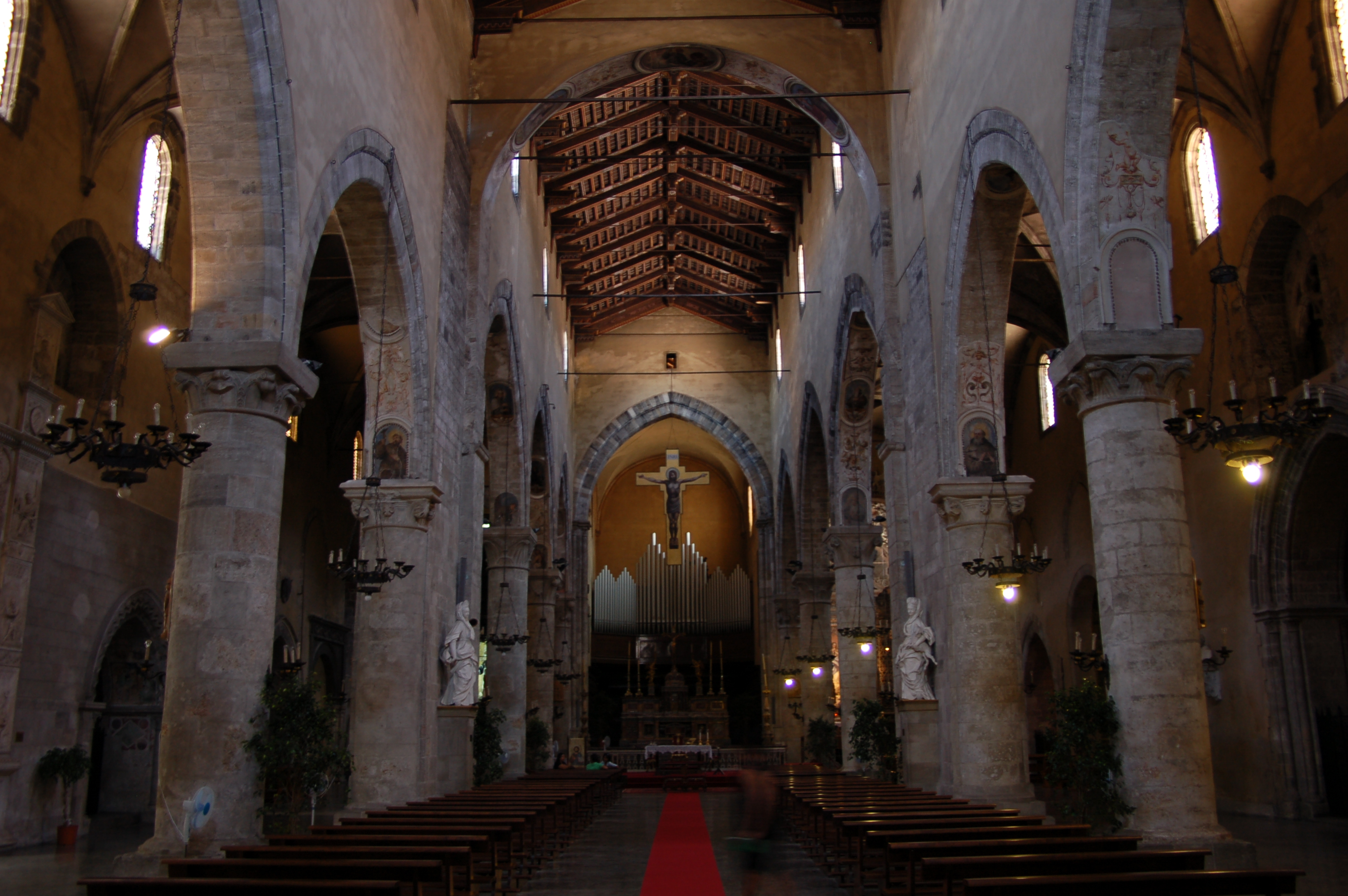
Interior of the church

The Church of Saint Francis of Assisi (Italian: Chiesa di San Francesco d'Assisi or simply San Francesco d'Assisi) is a Gothic-style, Roman Catholic church of Palermo. It is located near a major and ancient street of the city, via Cassaro, in the quarter of the Kalsa, within the historic centre of Palermo. The building represents the main Conventual Franciscan church of Sicily, and has the title of minor basilica.

== History ==
The history of the church starts with the arrival of the Franciscans in Sicily. In 1224 the chronicler Vadingo the start of construction of the first Franciscan convent near the Walls of Palermo. However, shortly after, the local clergy with the support of the Saracens chased the friars out from the city. The friars went to Viterbo and appealed to the Pope Gregory IX.

The pontiff ordered Landone, archbishop of Messina, to promote the reconstruction of the convent. The pope also took advantage of the absence of the archbishop of Palermo, Berard of Castagna, who had traveled to Germany with the Emperor Frederick II. Therefore, in 1235 the friars built a new convent by converting an old Byzantine fortification dating back to the military campaign of George Maniakes. In 1239, because of quarrels with the Pope, Frederick II decreed the building's destruction.

In 1255 the Vicar general of Sicily Ruffino Gorgone da Piacenza, chaplain of Pope Alexander IV, entrusted the reconstruction to the bishop of Malta, Roger. The work went on during the period of Charles of Anjou. In 1302 the main portal and the anterior façade were built, both in Chiaramontan-Gothic style. In the 15th century several chapels were built in Gothic and Renaissance style, including the Chapel Mastrantonio, the first manifestation of the Renaissance in Sicily.

Over the centuries the church became rich of artworks thanks to artists like Antonio di Belguardo, Antonio Scaglione, Giuseppe Giacalone, Francesco Laurana, Pietro de Bonitate, Gabriele di Battista, Domenico Pellegrino, Iacopo de Benedetto, Domenico Gagini, Antonello Gagini and his sons Antonio and Giacomo, Giuliano Mancino, Antonio Berrettaro, Antonello Crescenzio, Cesare da Sesto, Mariano Smiriglio, Vincenzo degli Azani, Pietro Novelli, Gerardo Astorino and Giacomo Serpotta. As a result, the interior of the church contains decorations from varied periods and styles, from gothic to baroque.

On 5 March 1823, the building was damaged by an earthquake. The church was restored in the Neoclassical style. Other damage was caused by the air raids during the Second World War. In recent decades the church was restored.

In 1924 Pope Pius XI assigned a title of minor basilica to this church. The church of Saint Francis of Assisi has an important role in the religious life of Palermo: in fact, in this church is enshrined the Simulacrum of the Immaculate Conception that every year, on the evening of December 8, pass through the streets of the historic center among thousands of believers who accompany the procession till the Piazza San Domenico.

== Gallery ==
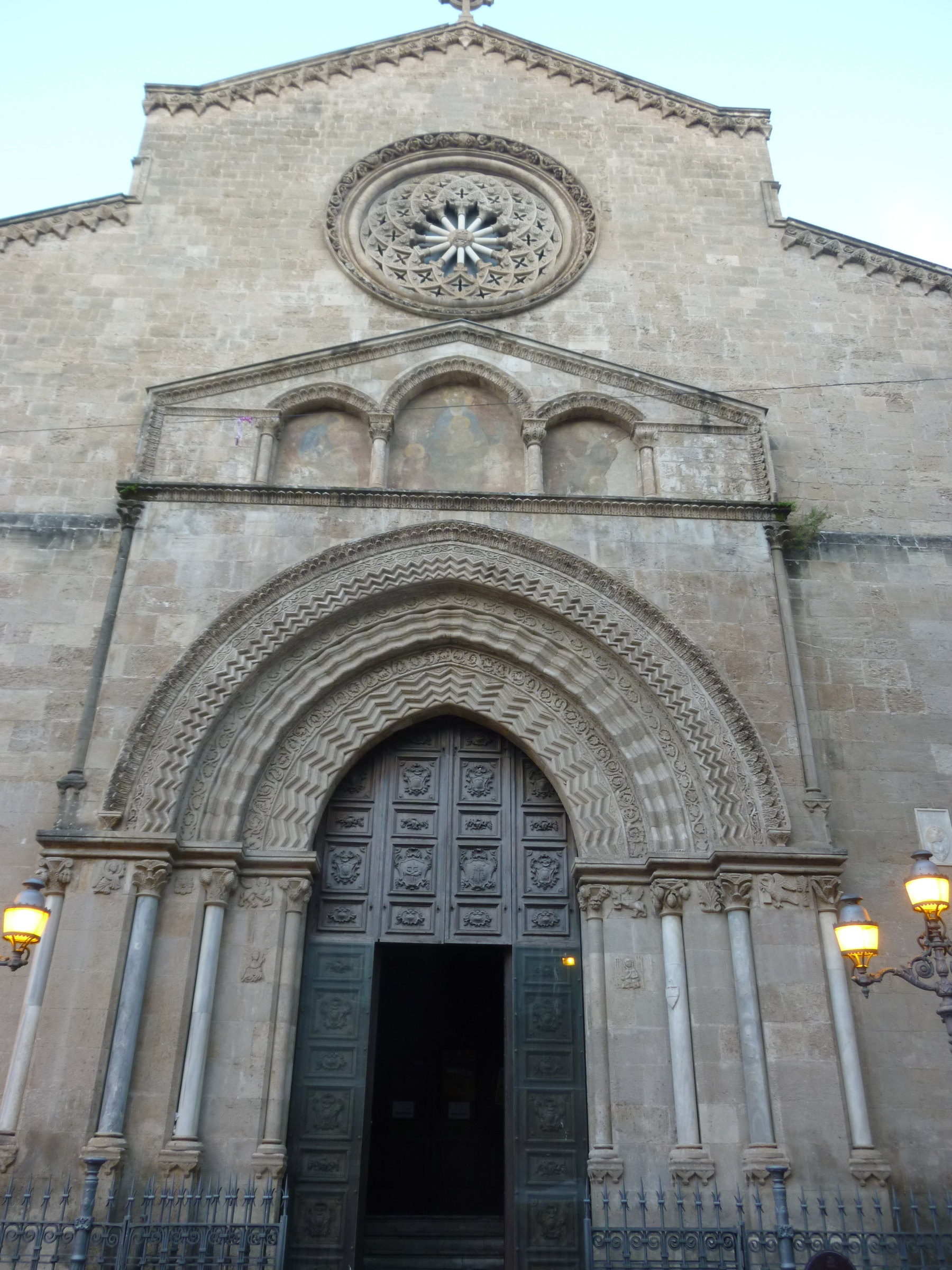
Portal

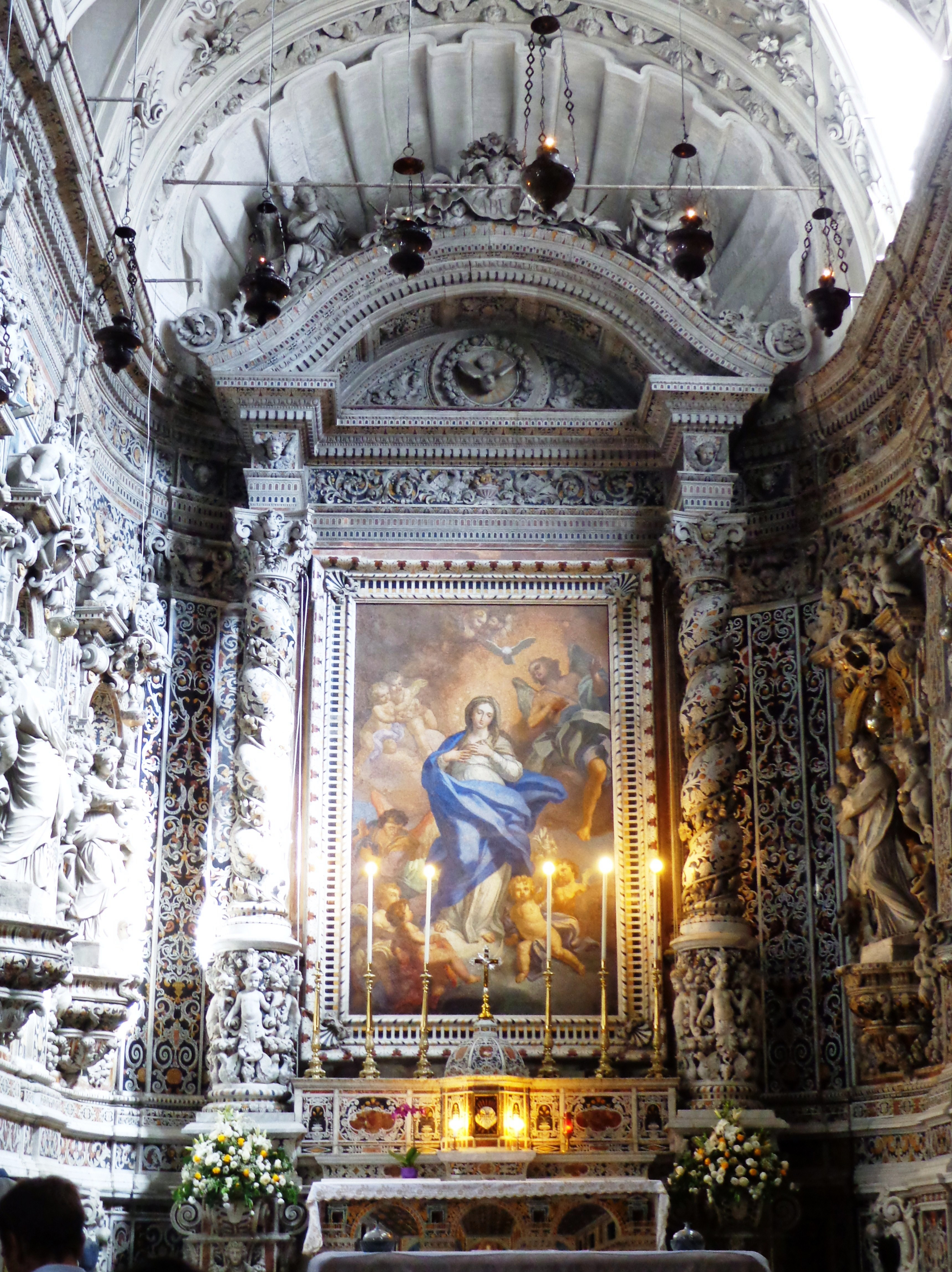
Chapel of the Immaculate Conception

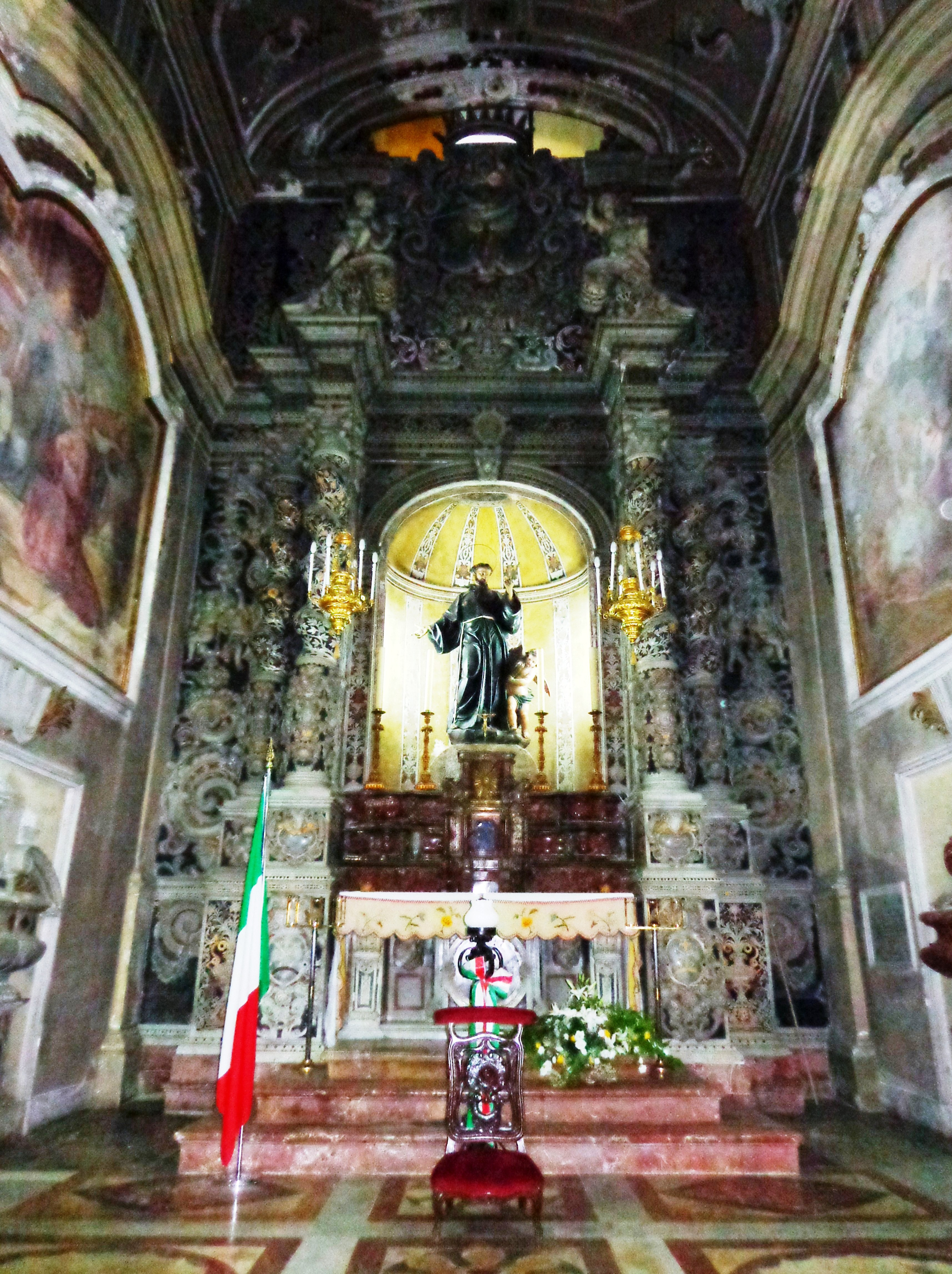
Chapel of Saint Francis

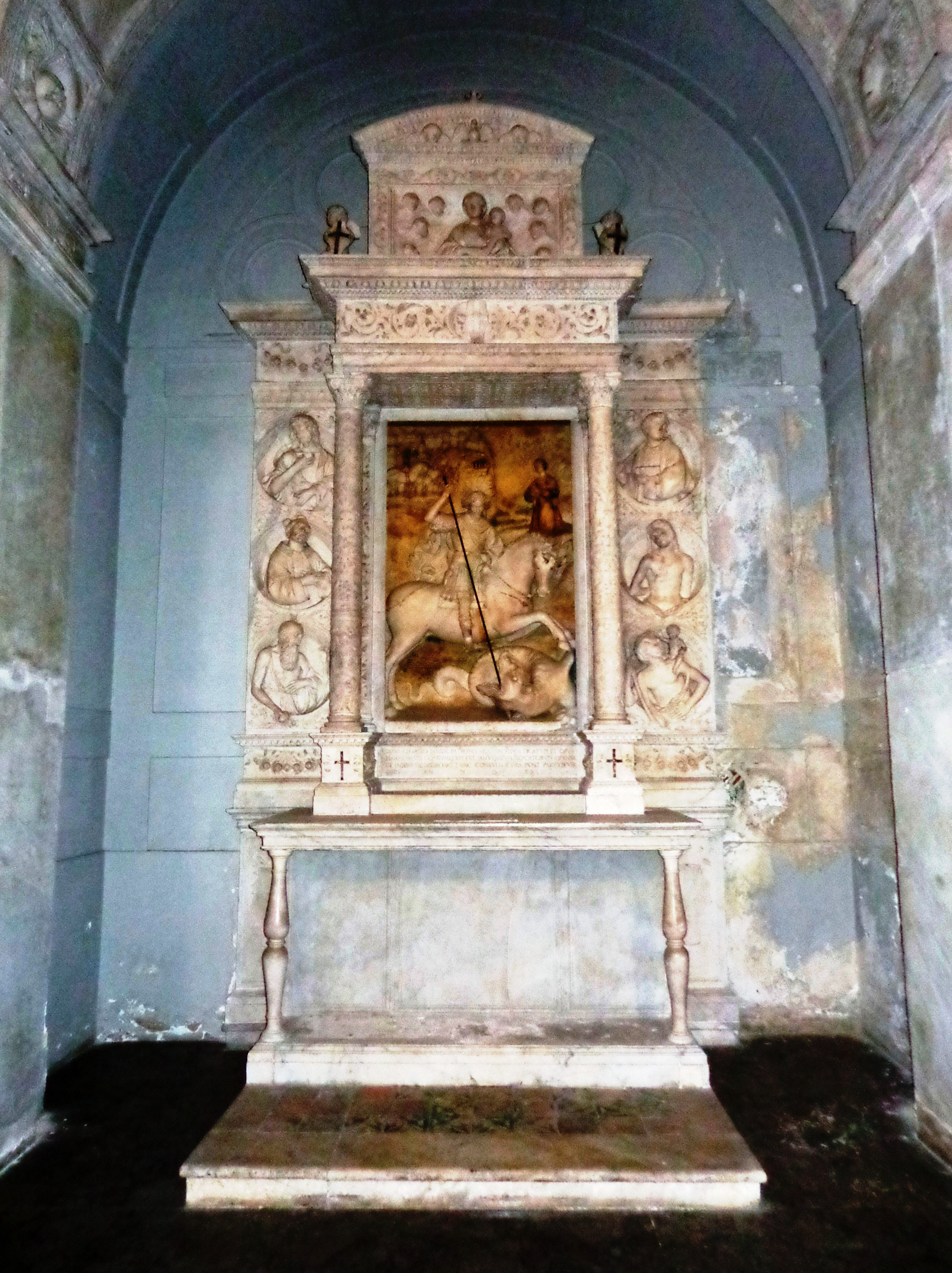
Chapel of Saint George

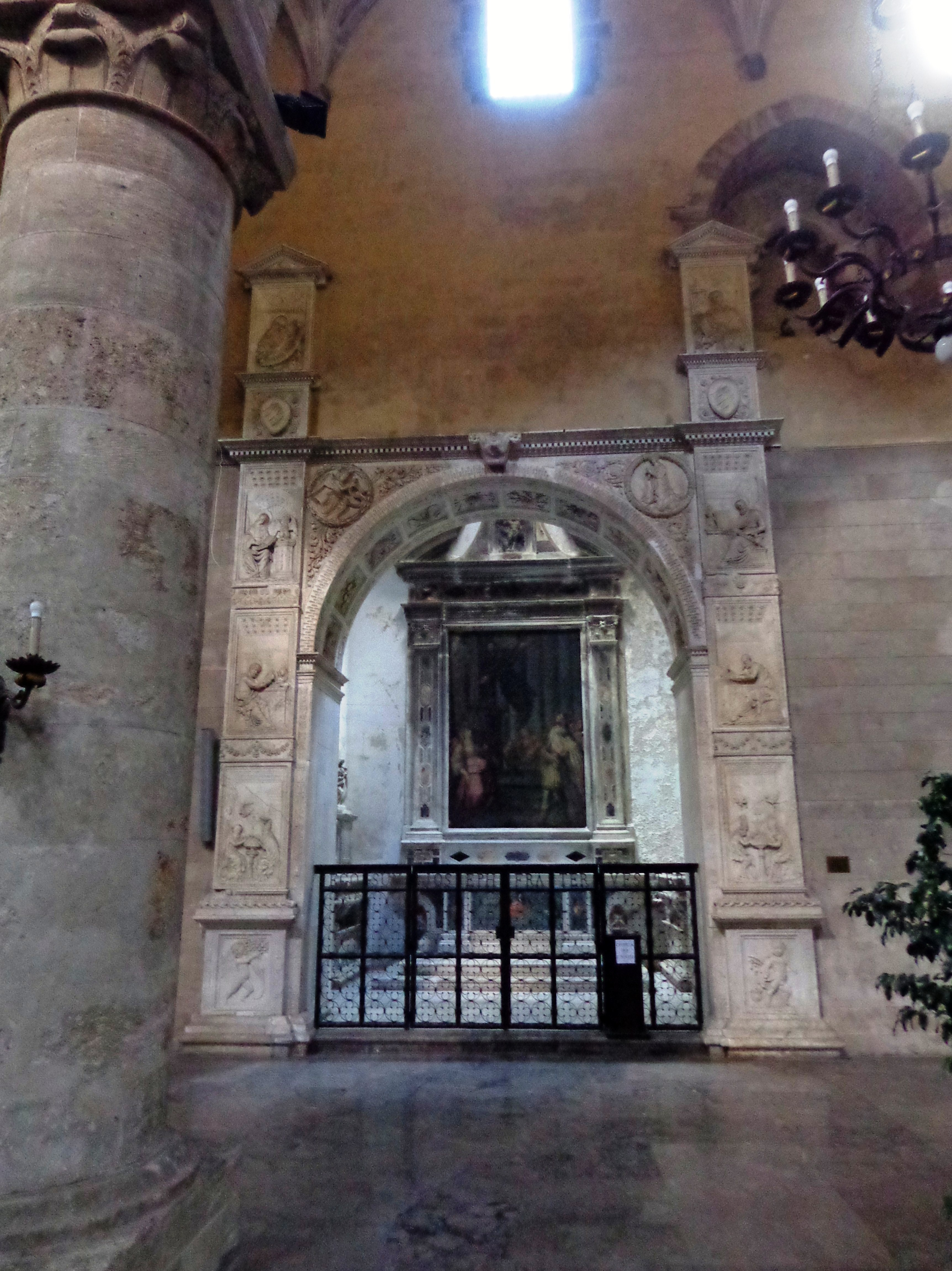
Chapel Mastrantonio

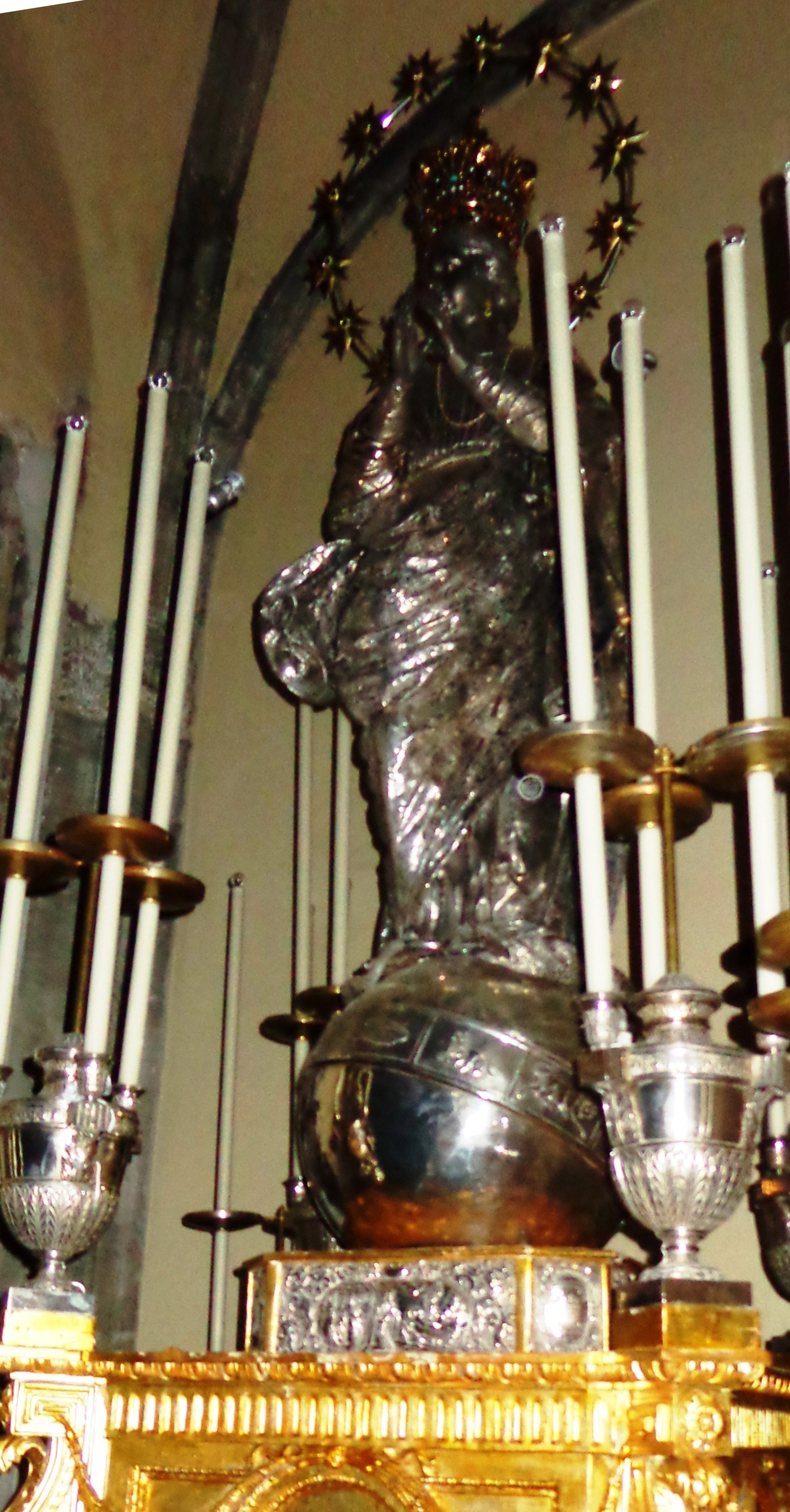
Simulacrum of the Immaculate Conception

== See also ==
- Kalsa
- Oratorio di San Lorenzo
- Oratorio dell'Immacolatella
