= Santa Cita, Palermo =

Roman Catholic parish church

Santa Cita or San Mamiliano
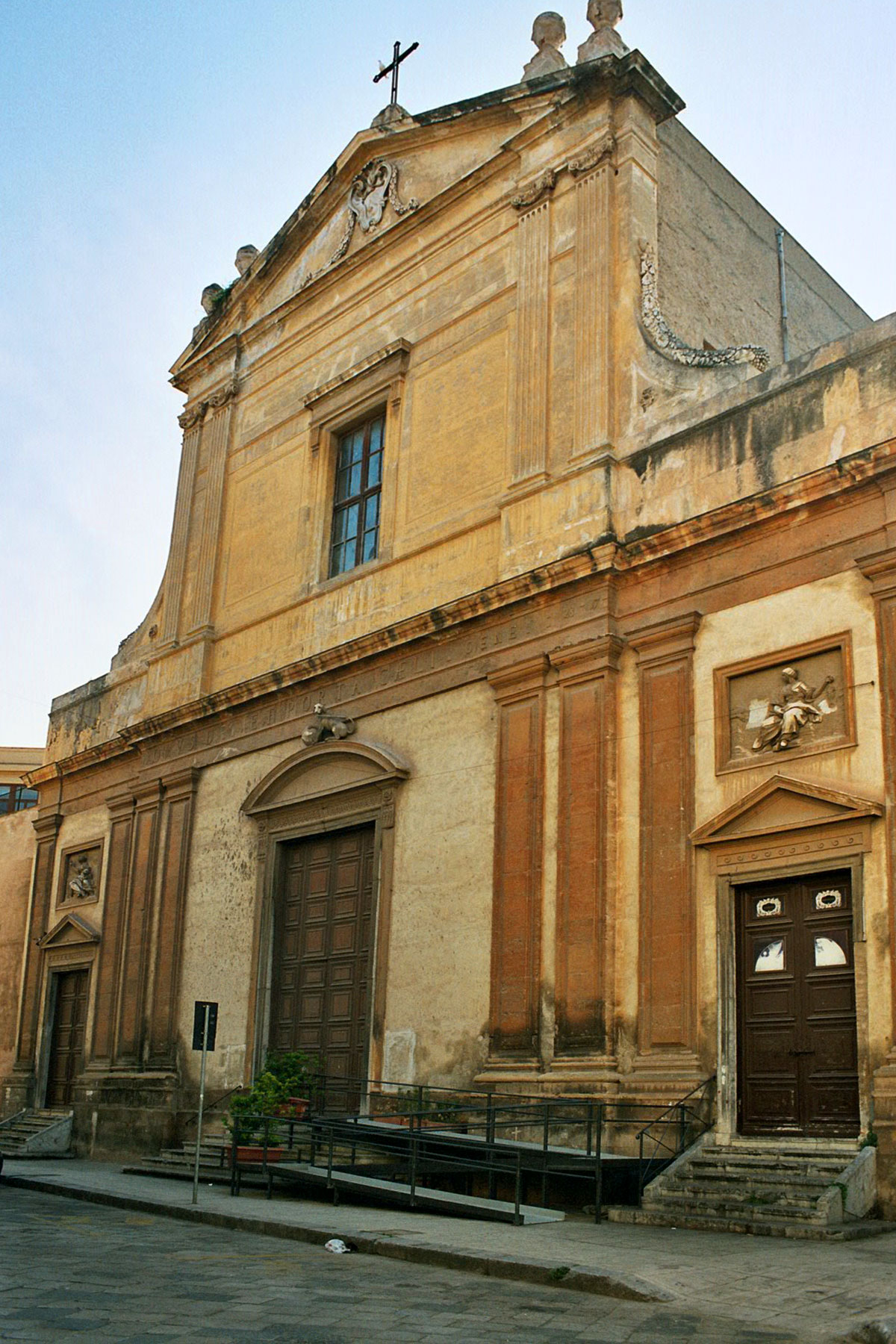

- Location in Sicily Location in Italy

Religion
- Affiliation: Roman Catholic
- Province: Archdiocese of Palermo
- Rite: Roman Rite

Location
- Location: Palermo, Italy
- Coordinates: 38.1210°N 13.3636°E

Santa Cita, reconsecrated in 1952 as San Mamiliano, is a baroque-style, Roman Catholic parish church located on Via Squarcialupo, 1, in the quarter of Castellammare of the city of Palermo, Sicily, Italy. The church and its artworks suffered heavily the bombardment during the Second World War, but it still contains original works and is attached to the Oratory of the Rosary of Santa Cita and less than a block north of the church of Santa Maria di Valverde.

== History ==
A church at the site, dedicated to the saint Zita of Lucca, was founded by Tuscan merchants in the early 14th-century and then attached to the Dominican order. In 1583, a new larger church was erected using designs by Giuseppe Giacalone, and completed in 1603. The facade was not completed until 1781 by Nicolò Peralta.

Initially the church had three side chapels and decorated aisles, but the destruction of the bombing in 1943 led to the reconstruction of the church with a single nave. The church was rededicated to San Mamiliano, first bishop of Palermo.

== Art and architecture ==
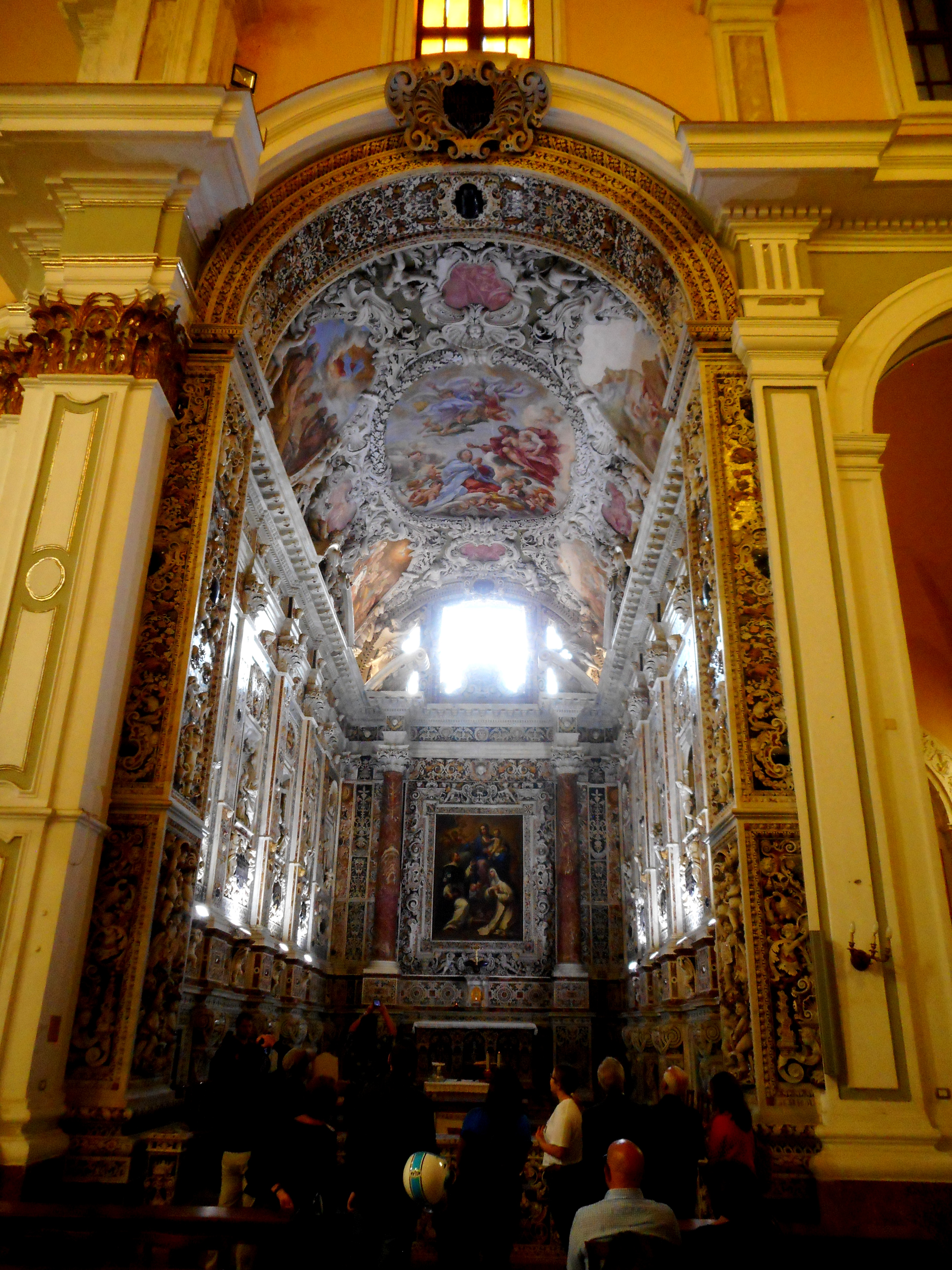
Chapel of the Rosary

Above the portal is a peculiar statue of a dog at the feet of a globe. Putatively in his mouth he carried a flaming torch. This image reflects a legend about a vision St Dominic's mother had before his birth, and later interpretations that Dominicans were dogged in their efforts to spread the flames of faith, and eradicate heresy. The two flanking reliefs in the facade depict allegories of Charity and Faith.

In the second chapel to the right is a Renaissance-style marble polyptych (1516) and arch by Antonello Gagini. He also sculpted the sarcophagus of Antonio Scirotta in a chapel on the left. The Chapel of the Crucifix was purchased in 1614 by the aristocratic Lanza family. The crypt below this chapel held four sarcophagi and a Pietà attributed to Giorgio da Milano. One of the sarcophagi holds Cesare Lanza, while another is said to hold Laura Lanza, Baroness of Carini, his first wife whom he murdered in 1563, putatively in a crime of passion.

Among the altarpieces in the church is a depiction of the Blessed Geremia (1785) by Antonio Manno in the left transept, and a depiction of Saint Agnes of Montepulciano (1603) by Filippo Paladini. The first chapel on the right transept, dedicated to the Madonna del Rosario, survived the bombardment. It is richly decorated with polychrome marble and small tableux made with stucco (1697-1721) by Gioacchino Vitagliano. These teatrini or dramatic set-pieces depict the scenes of the Mystery of the Rosary. The ceiling is frescoes framed with elaborate stucco with the five glorious mysteries of the Rosary, by Pietro Aquila. These tableux can be compared to the ones made by Serpotta for the adjacent oratory.
