= Palazzo Cesi =

Palazzo Cesi may refer to:

- Palazzo Cesi-Armellini in Rome, Via della Conciliazione
- Palazzo Cesi-Gaddi in Rome, Via della Maschera d'Oro, headquarters of the Military Judiciary Council of Italy
- Palazzo Muti-Cesi in Rome, Via del Gesù
- Palazzo Cesi in Acquasparta, Italy
