= Giorgio Santacroce =

Italian magistrate

Giorgio Santacroce (born La Spezia, 6 April 1941 - Rome, 13 January 2017) was an Italian magistrate. He was the first president of the Supreme Court of Cassation.

== Career ==
Santacroce served as public prosecutor at the Rome prosecutor's office from 1970 to 1990. He was involved in the fight against national and international terrorism, the Ustica massacre, and the black funds of the Banca Nazionale del Lavoro. He joined the public prosecutor's office of Rome in 1990, where he represented the government in the trial against the Magliana gang for the kidnapping of Duke Grazioli. In 1997, he was appointed a councillor of the Supreme Court. The plenum of the judicial high council, which met on 8 May 2013 and was chaired by the president of the republic, appointed Santacroce as the first president of the Supreme Court. He won with 13 votes in his favor, against nine favoring Luigi Rovelli. He assumed the position on May 13 of that year, and served until 1 January 2016. He was also president of the Military Judiciary Council.
