= Giacalone =

Giacalone is a surname. Notable people with the surname include:

- Anthony Giacalone (1919–2001), organized crime figure
- Giuseppe Giacalone (second half of the 16th century), Italian architect
- Paul Giacalone (1939–2013), singer and drummer of American group The Fireflies
- Vito Giacalone (1923–2012), organized crime figure
