= San Giovanni degli Eremiti =

Church in Palermo, Sicily, Italy

Church of Saint John of the Hermits
- Chiesa di San Giovanni degli Eremiti (in Italian)
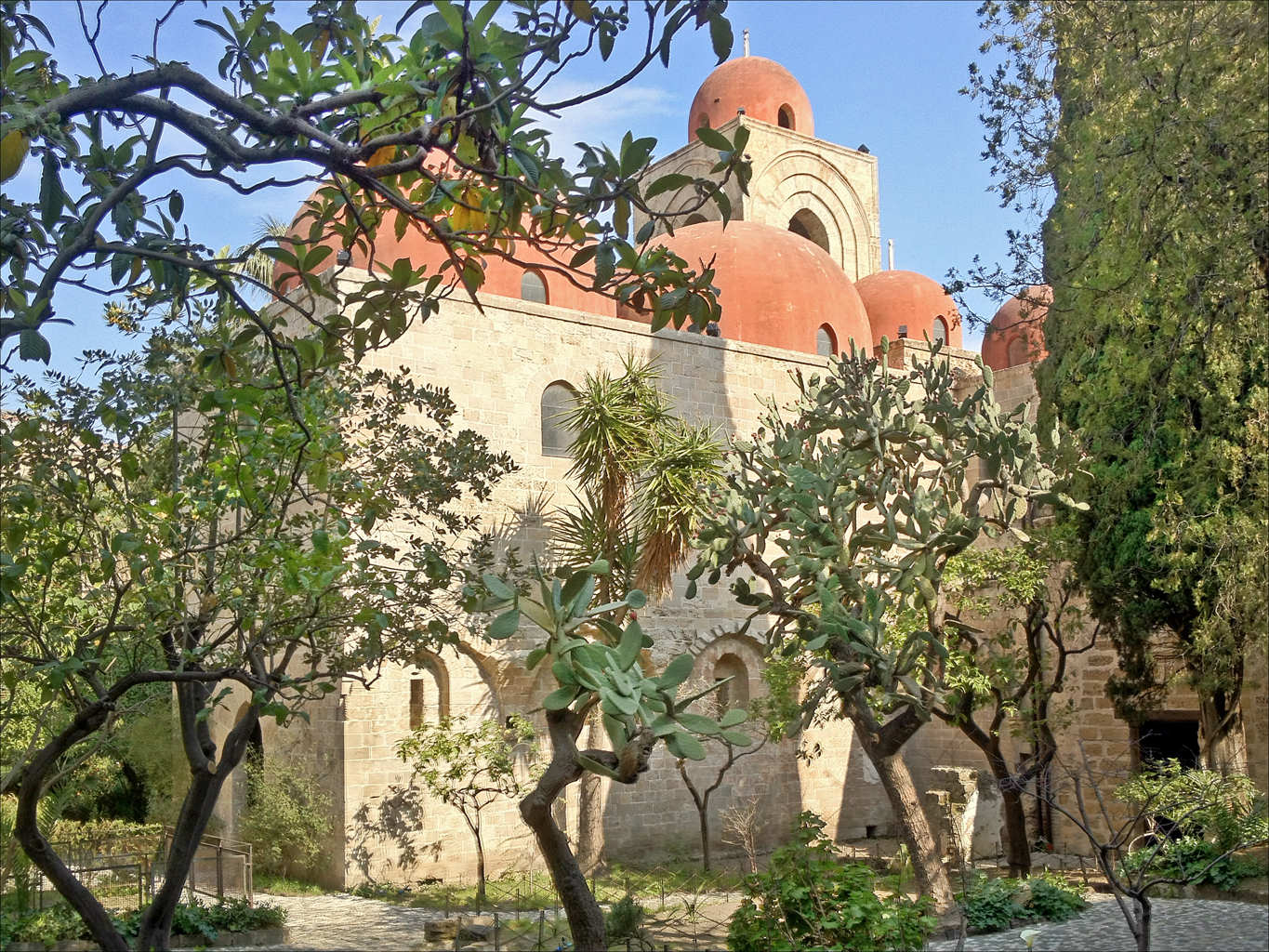
- Exterior of the Church

Religion
- Affiliation: Roman Catholic
- Province: Archdiocese of Palermo
- Rite: Roman Rite

Location
- Location: Palermo, Italy
- Interactive map of Church of Saint John of the Hermits
- Coordinates: 38°06′35″N 13°21′17″E

Architecture
- Style: Arab-Norman, Romanesque
- Groundbreaking: 6th century
- Completed: 1132
- UNESCO World Heritage Site
- Official name: Arab-Norman Palermo and the Cathedral Churches of Cefalù and Monreale
- Type: Cultural
- Criteria: ii, iv
- Designated: 2015 (39th session)
- Reference no.: 1487
- State Party: Italy
- Region: Europe and North America

San Giovanni degli Eremiti (St John of the Hermits) is an ancient former monastic church located on Via Benedettini #19 in the ancient quarter of Albergaria of the city of Palermo, region of Sicily, Italy. It is about two blocks south from the Palazzo dei Normanni, adjacent to the church of San Giorgio in Kemonia. While the interior is virtually devoid of decoration or furnishings, the Islamic domes, Romanesque cloister ruins, and garden make this small church a symbol of ancient Palermo.

== History ==
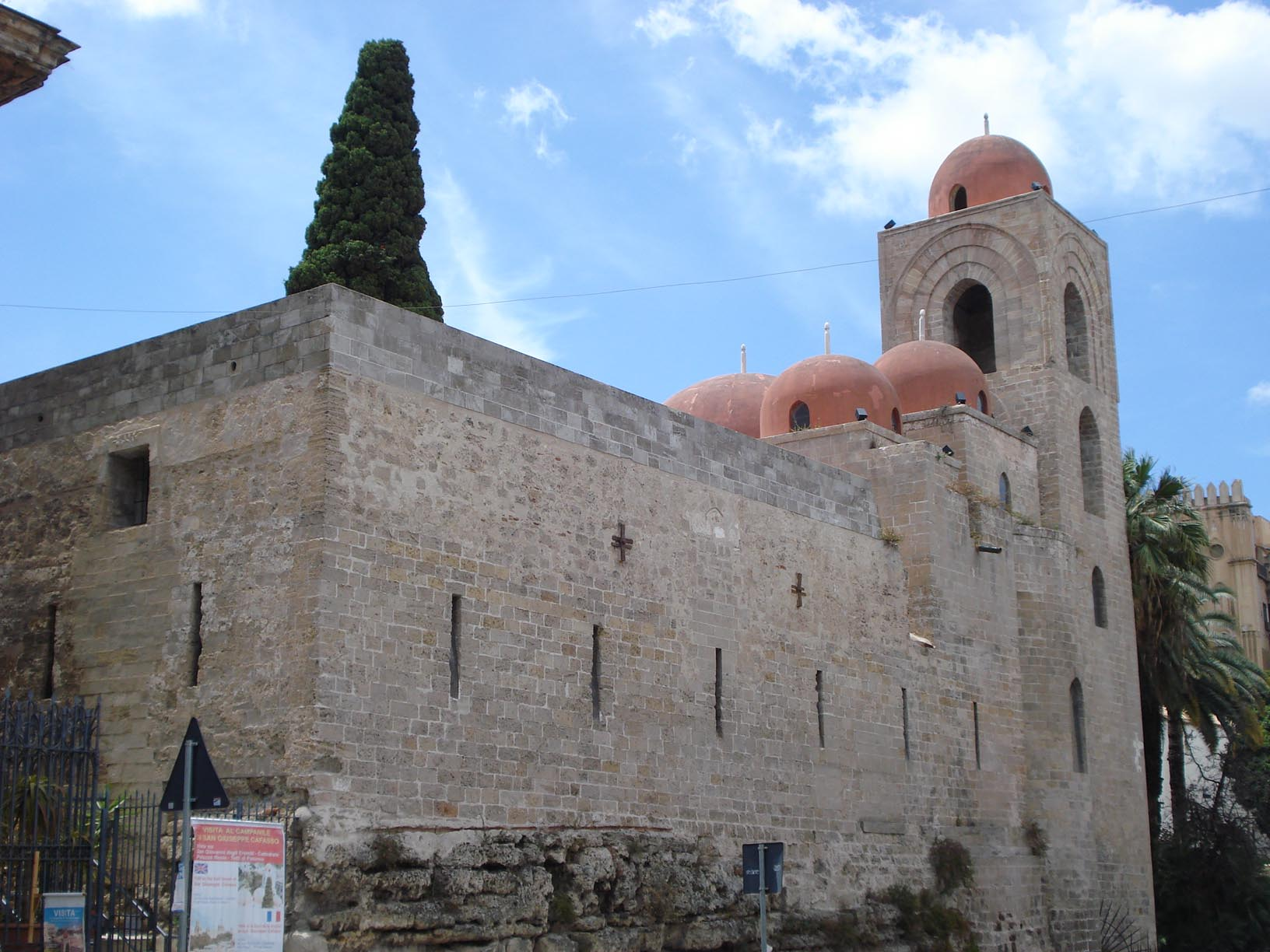
San Giovanni degli Eremiti

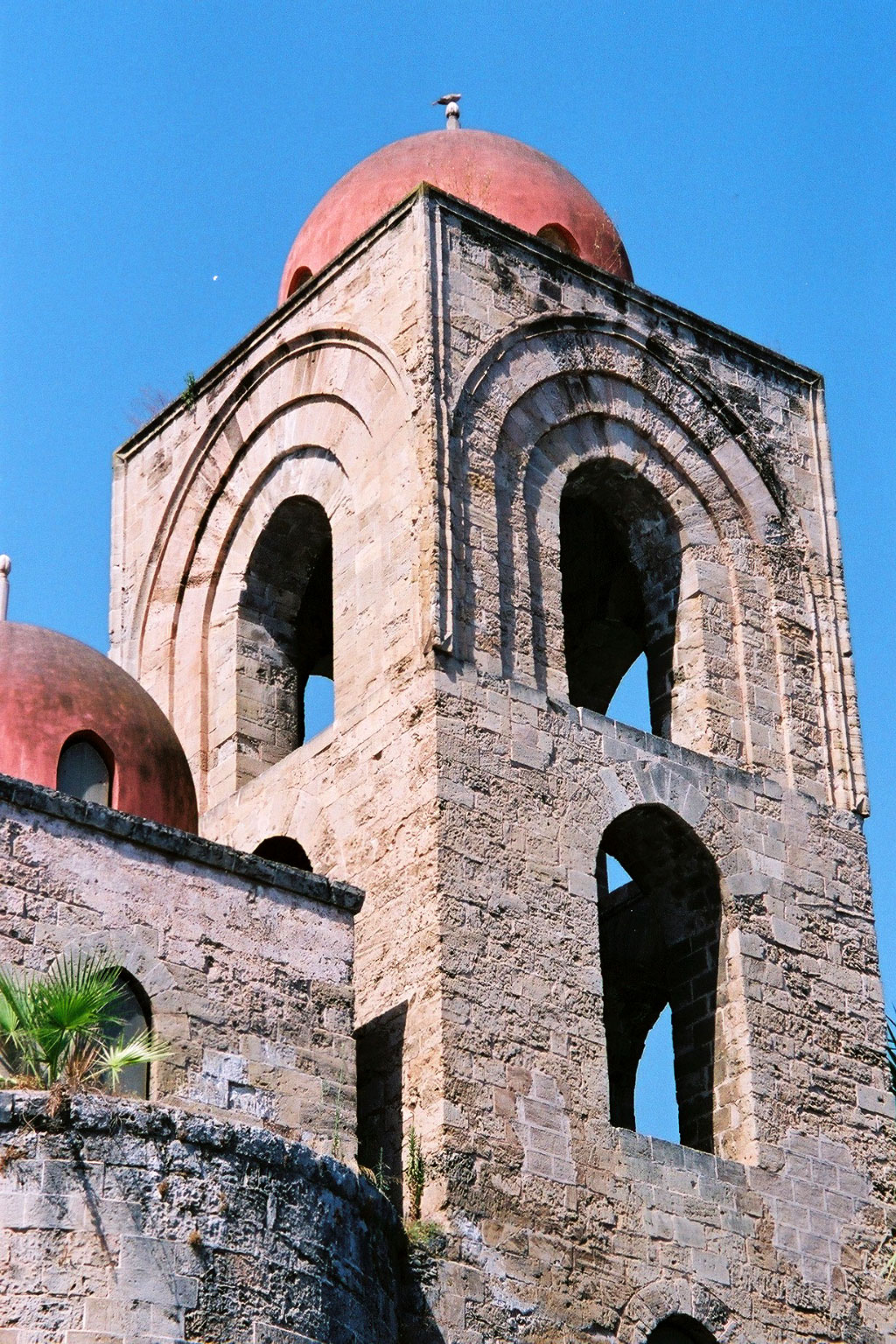
Detail of the bell tower

A church and a Benedictine monastery existed at the site date prior to the 6th century. Pope Gregory the Great is said to have patronized its establishment. The seventh-century Pope Agatho took orders at this monastery. It is said that the Saracen conquerors closed or razed the monastery, perhaps converting the church to a mosque. After the Norman conquest, circa 1136, the site was restored by Roger II of Sicily to Benedictine monks of Saint William of Vercelli . The church was dedicated to St John the Evangelist.

It is not clear why the church gained the tag of Eremiti. While it is possible that it refers to the cloistered Benedictine monks (hermits, from Greek eremìtes, monks).

In the 19th century, under the guidance of Giuseppe Patricolo, director of the Royal office for the conservation of monuments of Sicily, the structures were restored aiming for his perspective of their original medieval appearance.

== Architecture ==
The church is notable for its brilliant red domes, which show clearly the persistence of Arab influences in Sicily at the time of its reconstruction in the 12th century, the Arab-Norman culture. In her 1882 Diary of an Idle Woman in Sicily, Frances Elliot described it as "... totally oriental... it would fit well in Baghdad or Damascus". However, the red color of the domes are not original, as they were painted in this color by Patricolo who found pieces of red plaster on the domes and therefore decided to paint all the domes in red.

The church lies with a flank on a square construction. The church is on the Latin Cross plan with a nave and two aisles and three apses. Each of the square spans is surmounted by a dome. The presbytery, ending with a niche, has also a dome.

The cloister, enriched by a luxurious garden, is the best preserved part of the ancient monastery. It has notable small double columns with capitals decorated by vegetable motifs, which support ogival arches. It also includes an Arab cistern.

== See also ==
- Arab-Norman Palermo and the Cathedral Churches of Cefalù and Monreale
- High medieval domes
