= Santa Maria di Valverde, Palermo =

Roman Catholic parish church in Palermo, Italy

San Giuseppe Cafasso or San Giorgio in Kemona
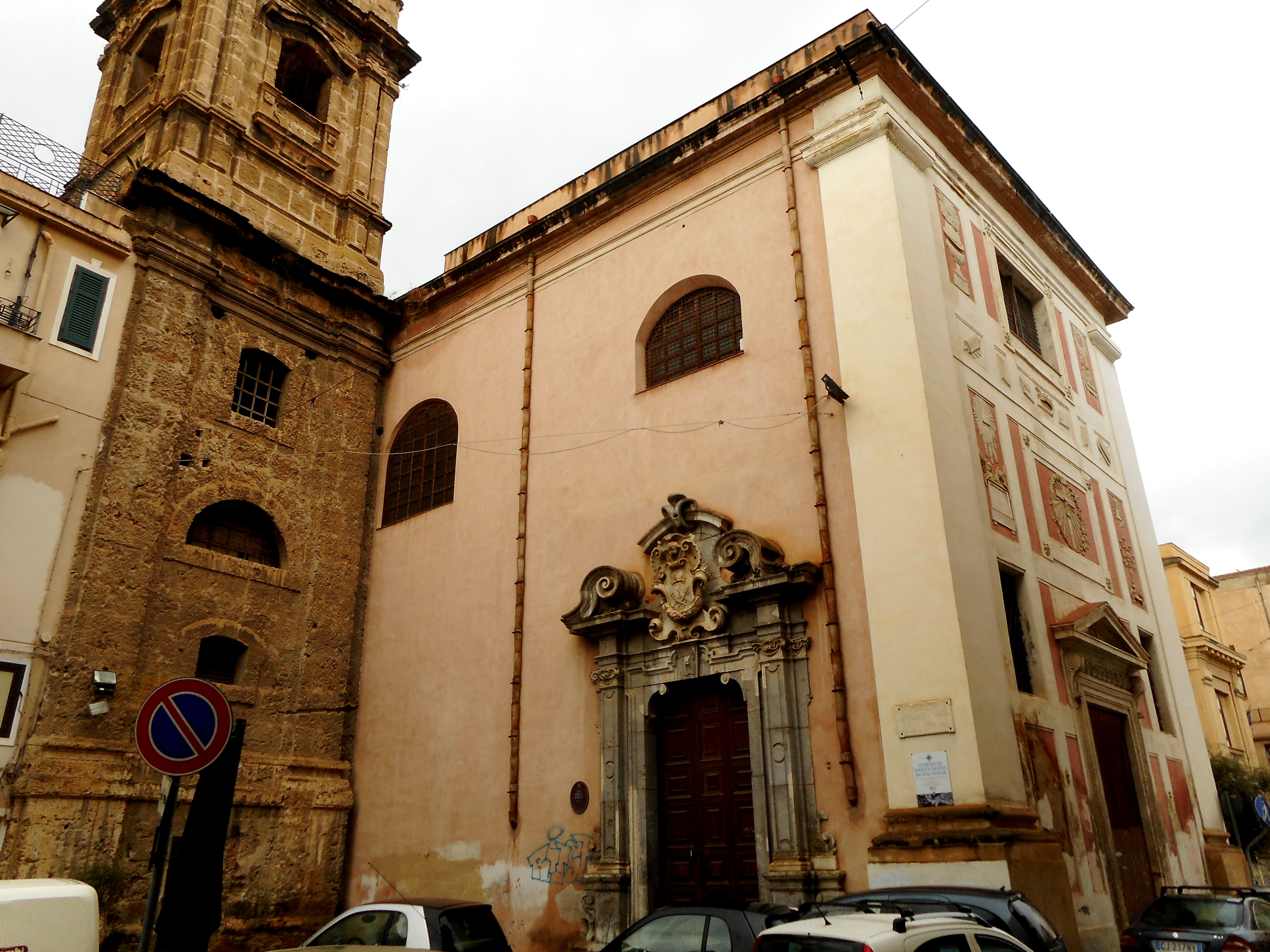

Religion
- Affiliation: Roman Catholic
- Province: Archdiocese of Palermo
- Rite: Roman Rite

Location
- Location: Palermo, Italy
- Interactive map of San Giuseppe Cafasso or San Giorgio in Kemona
- Coordinates: 38.12036°N 13.36404°E

Santa Maria di Valvedre is a baroque-style, Roman Catholic parish church located on Via Squarcialupo #2 in the quarter of Castellamare of the city of Palermo, region of Sicily, Italy.

== History ==
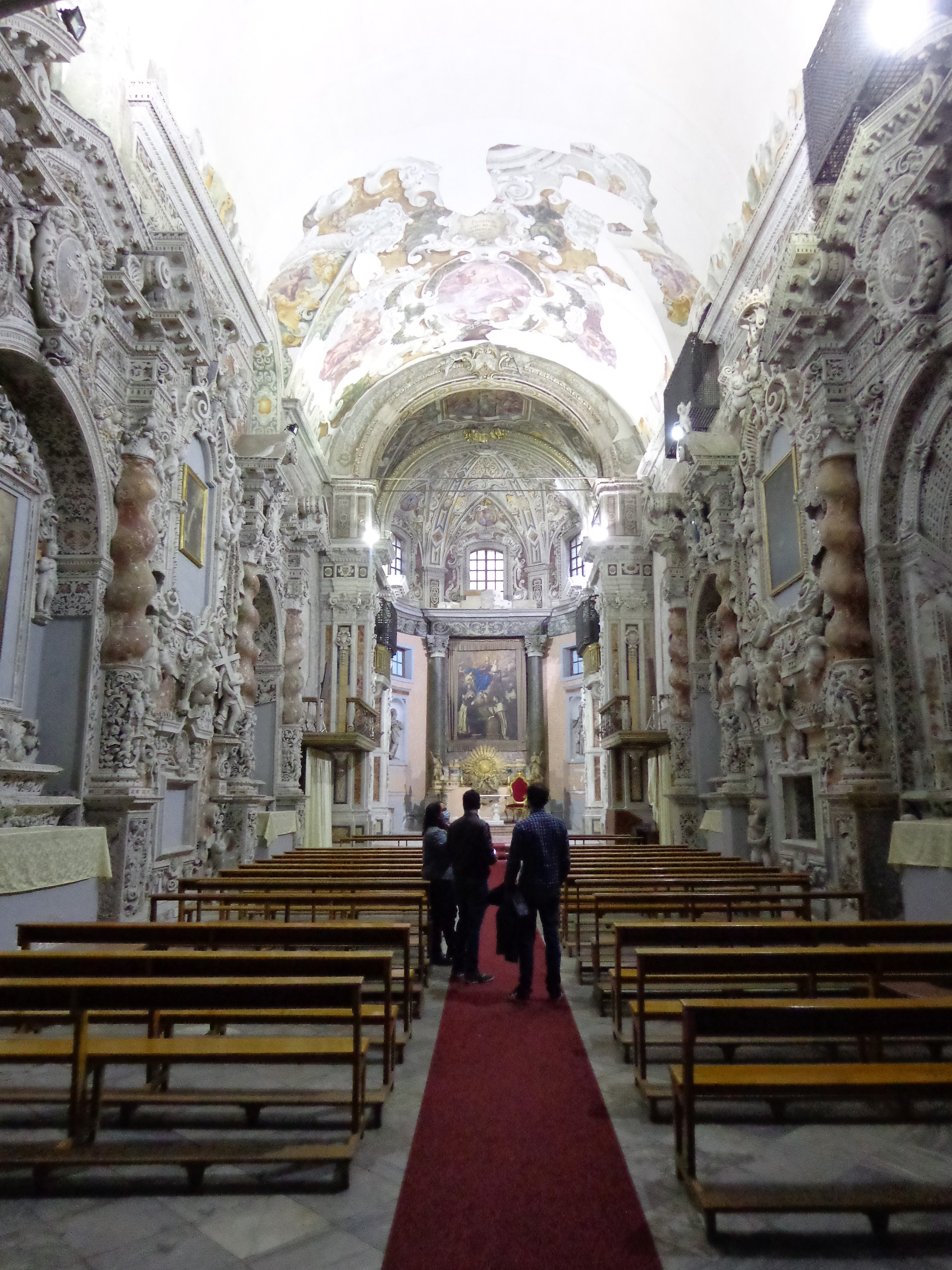
View towards apse

A church here was originally attached to a 14th-century Carmelite monastery. In 1633 it was refurbished funded by the endowment by a wealthy Genoese, Camillo Pallavicino, whose daughter had entered the monastery. Initially, rebuilt under the designs of Mariano Smiriglio; work in the interior continued under Paolo Amato. Additional work on the structure was concluded by Andrea Palma, Abate Mango, and finally in the 19th century by Giuseppe Patricolo.

The exterior is box-like, neoclassical style, with some symbolic relief panels. The interior is a rectangular hall is more richly decorated. The sottocoro, or entrance room underneath the second floor choir, was painted with a Virgin in Glory (1750) by Olivio Sozzi. But the frescoes above the choir are mostly lost, and were the work of Antonio Gramsci or Grano. The Carmelite monastery was suppressed in 1866, but restarted in 1872. The church was heavily damaged during the second world war, and restorations only begun between 1979 and 1980. In 1997 the church was reconsecrated for worship.

In the semicircular apse are decorations by Giuseppe Patricolo. The main altarpiece is a depiction of the Madonna del Carmine (1642) by Pietro Novelli. The apse ceiling frescoes are attributed to Guglielmo Borremans.
