= San Giorgio in Kemonia =

Roman Catholic parish church in Sicily, Italy

San Giuseppe Cafasso or San Giorgio in Kemona
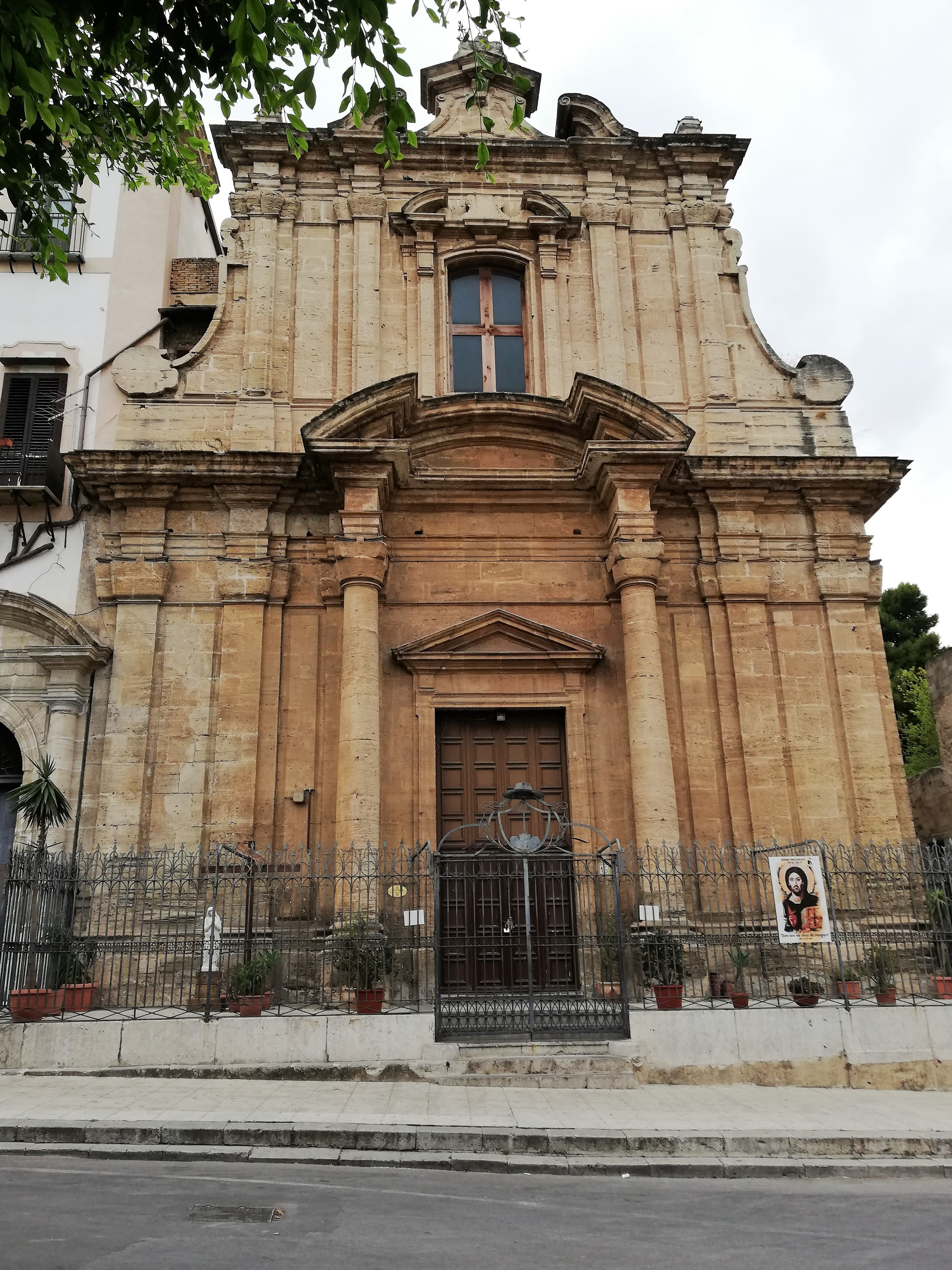

Religion
- Affiliation: Roman Catholic
- Province: Archdiocese of Palermo
- Rite: Roman Rite

Location
- Location: Palermo, Italy
- Interactive map of San Giuseppe Cafasso or San Giorgio in Kemona
- Coordinates: 38.10938°N 13.35493°E

San Giorgio in Kemonia, some decades ago renamed as San Giuseppe Cafasso, is a Roman Catholic parish church located on Via dei Benedettini #13 in the city of Palermo, region of Sicily, Italy. In 1953, the church was rededicated to Joseph Cafasso (1811-1860), patron saint of prisoners, due to former nearby female prison. The apse of the ancient church of San Giovanni degli Eremiti ends on the right flank of the church. Across the street are a series of building forming the Giovanni di Cristina Children's Hospital.

== History ==
Churches at this site have had many owners. The church was built near or atop a former stream or river (Kemonia) that flowed through to a bay, which formed part of the Palermo harbor; but the river ceased to flow by the 16th century. A church was putatively present at the site by the 4th century, and after the Norman conquest of Sicily, a church here was affiliated with a Cistercian monastery. Later the church was assigned to the Olivetan order, with benedictine monks deriving from the monastery of Santa Maria di Monte Oliveto allo Spasimo in town. In 1765, a major refurbishment was begun that transformed the then 14th-century church into a late-baroque style.

The facade is made with yellow stone and proliferates with pilasters. The portico has broken tympanum and protrudes with two columns. The interior has a single nave with three chapels to each side. The apse still retains its medieval semicircular layout. The interior walls are decorated in stucco by the Serpotta family. Among the frescoes is the ceiling painting depicting the Madonna grants St Benedict the habit of his order by Giuseppe Tresca. The Crucifix reliquary in the third chapel on the right was made by Giuseppe Marabitti.
