= Giuseppe Patricolo =

Italian architect and engineer

Giuseppe Patricolo (1834 – 1905) was an Italian architect and engineer, best known for restoring many of the medieval, including Norman architecture, buildings in and near his native Palermo in Sicily.

In 1866, he was named professor of descriptive geometry at the University of Palermo, and in 1875, professor of design and architecture. From 1884 to his death, he served as artistic director of the monuments, and director of the Royal office for the conservation of monuments of Sicily. Among the structure, in which he was involved in the restoration are the church of San Francesco d'Assisi, San Cataldo, Santo Spirito, San Giovanni degli Eremiti, and the Santa Maria dell'Ammiraglio in Palermo; as well as the Norman church of the Santissima Trinità di Delia in Castelvetrano.

His son, Achille Patricolo, also an architect; born in Palermo; was a curator at the Islamic Museum in Cairo till 1922. As an antiquarian, he sold pottery to the British Museum in 1921.

== Works ==
- Le chiese di Santo Spirito e di S. Maria dell'Ammiraglio in Palermo, Palermo, 1882
- La chiesa di S. Maria dell'Ammiraglio in Palermo e le sue antiche adiacenze, (Estratto dall'Archivio Storico Siciliano 1877 e 1879), Palermo, 1883
- Il monumento arabo scoverto in Febbraro 1882 e la contigua chiesa di S. Giovanni degli Eremiti in Palermo, (Estratto dall'Archivio Storico Siciliano, N. S. anno VII, 1882.), Palermo, 1883
