= Military Judiciary Council of Italy =

Italian military judiciary

Council of the Military Judiciary

Agency overview
- Formed: 1989
- Jurisdiction: Government of Italy
- Headquarters: Palazzo Cesi, Rome
- Agency executive: Giovanni Canzio

The Council of the Military Judiciary (Italian: Consiglio della magistratura militare), also known as CMM, is the self governing body of the Italian military judiciary. The seat of the council is located in Palazzo Cesi, Rome.

== History ==
It was provided for by law no. 561, establishing the Council of the military judiciary, and the relative implementing regulation, the DPR March 24, 1989 n. 158, containing the Implementation Rules of the Law of 30 December 1988, n. 561, which established the Military Judicial Council, in order to standardize the military judges to ordinary judges, giving the Council of the Military Judiciary the same powers provided for the High Council of the Judiciary (Italy).

== Functions ==
The council for military magistrates has the same powers as the High Council of the Judiciary. In particular, it provides for recruitment, assignments, transfers, promotions, disciplinary proceedings and any other aspect inherent to the legal status of military magistrates, as well as the conferral of extrajudicial appointments and any other matter attributed to it by law.

In relation to disciplinary proceedings, the Minister of Justice and the Attorney General at the Court of Cassation are replaced, respectively, by the Minister of Defense and the Military Attorney General at the Court of Cassation. The disciplinary procedure against military magistrates is governed by the rules in force for ordinary magistrates. The military attorney general at the Court of Cassation exercises the functions of public prosecutor and does not participate in the deliberations.

== Composition ==
The Council of the Military Judiciary previously comprised:

- 1 military attorney general at the Court of Cassation, member by right;
- 2 lay members appointed, in concert, by the presidents of the two branches of Parliament, chosen from among university professors in law and lawyers with at least fifteen years of professional practice, of which one is elected vice president by the council; the two components unrelated to the military judiciary cannot exercise professional activity likely to interfere with the functions of the military judiciary nor can they exercise professional activities in the interest or on behalf of, or against, the military administration;
- 5 military magistrates, one of which with cassation functions, elected by all military magistrates.

Following the law of 24 December 2007 n. 244, art. 2, paragraph 604, and starting from the first elections for the renewal of the Military Judiciary Council and as a result of the law of 3 August 2009, n. 102 the members of the Board are restated as follows:

- 1 military attorney general at the Court of Cassation, member by right;
- 1 lay member appointed, in concert, by the presidents of the two branches of Parliament, who assumes the functions of vice president of the council;
- 2 military magistrates, one of which with cassation functions, elected by all military magistrates.

== The legal status of the components ==
As regards the legal status of non-magistrate members of the council, the provisions relating to the CSM, as applicable, are observed, namely the law of 24 March 1958, n. 195, et seq. The economic treatment of these members is established with the Prime Minister's Decree, on the proposal of the Minister of Defense, in agreement with the Minister of Economy and Finance, having regard to incompatibilities, workloads and allowances of the members of the Council superior of the judiciary elected by parliament.

== Current members ==
- President: Giovanni Canzio, First President of the Court of Cassation;
- Vice President: Antonio Scaglione, member designated by the Presidents of the Chamber and the Senate;
- Legal member: Pier Paolo Rivello, Military Attorney General at the Court of Cassation;
- Elected members: Maria Teresa Poli and Bruno Alberto Bruni, magistrates.
