= Giuseppe Giacalone =

Italian architect

Giuseppe Giacalone was an Italian architect active in the second half of the 16th century, primarily in his native city of Palermo, Sicily. He worked in the Mannerist style.

Giacalone was born into a family of builders (Italian: capomastri) in the Capo neighborhood of the Seralcadi quarter. He contributed to the design of the facades of the Porta Nuova in Palermo and oversaw the roofing of the nave of the Church of Santa Maria la Nova. He also played a role in completing the cloister of the Convent of Santa Cita. In 1586, the Dominican order in town gave him the commission to design and build the new church of Santa Cita, completed in 1622.
