= Antonio Scaglione =

Antonio Scaglione was a 16th-century architect, active in Sicily in a Gothic style.

Scaglione's designs appear somewhat archaic for his era, when Renaissance architecture had risen in popularity. He helped complete the design of the church of Santa Maria di Porto Salvo in Palermo, which was begun in the Renaissance manner by Antonello Gagini (1478–1536).
