= The Lions of Sicily =

Italian historical drama television series

- Italian Disney+ poster
- Italian: I leoni di Sicilia
- Genre: Historical drama
- Based on: The Florios of Sicily by Stefania Auci
- Written by: Ludovica Rampoldi; Stefano Sardo
- Directed by: Paolo Genovese
- Starring: Michele Riondino; Miriam Leone; Donatella Finocchiaro; Vinicio Marchioni; Eduardo Scarpetta; Paolo Briguglia; Ester Pantano; Adele Cammarata
- Country of origin: Italy
- Original languages: Italian; Sicilian
- No. of episodes: 8

Production
- Executive producer: Paolo Sciarretta
- Producers: Marco Belardi; Simone Frattari; Raffaella Leone; Federico Scardamaglia
- Cinematography: Fabrizio Lucci
- Editor: Consuelo Catucci
- Running time: 39–58 minutes

Original release
- Network: Disney+; Rai 1; Hulu (United States); Star+ (Latin America)
- Release: 23 October – 1 November 2023

The Lions of Sicily (Italian: I leoni di Sicilia) is a 2023 Italian historical drama television series based on The Florios of Sicily by Stefania Auci. It premiered at the 18th Rome Film Festival on 23 October 2023 and was released on Disney+ on 25 October 2023.

== Premise ==
The series follows the Florio family of Sicily in the 1800s.

== Cast ==
=== Main ===
- Michele Riondino as Vincenzo Florio
- Miriam Leone as Giulia Portalupi
- Donatella Finocchiaro as Giuseppina Saffiotti
  - Ester Pantano as young Giuseppina
- Vinicio Marchioni as Paolo Florio
- Eduardo Scarpetta as Ignazio Florio
- Paolo Briguglia as Ignazio Florio
- Adele Cammarata as Giovanna d’Ondes

=== Supporting ===
- Emmanuele Aita as Peppe Messina
- Massimo De Lorenzo as Frangipane
- Clara Tramontano as Angela Portalupi
- Gaja Masciale as Giuseppina Portalupi
- Michele Ragno as Giovanni Portalupi
- Claudia Pandolfi as Duchess Spadafora
- Antonio Gerardi as Carlo Filangieri
- Tony Sperandeo as Canzonieri
- Sandra Ceccarelli as Antonia Portalupi
- Reed Stokes as Ben Ingham
  - Guy Oliver Watts as older Ben Ingham

== Episodes ==
No.	Title	Duration	Original release date
1	"Episode 1"	55 min	25 October 2023
2	"Episode 2"	57 min	25 October 2023
3	"Episode 3"	55 min	25 October 2023
4	"Episode 4"	51 min	25 October 2023
5	"Episode 5"	56 min	1 November 2023
6	"Episode 6"	39 min	1 November 2023
7	"Episode 7"	42 min	1 November 2023
8	"Episode 8"	58 min	1 November 2023

== Production ==
On 6 July 2022, it was announced that Disney+ had greenlit and began filming the series in Rome. Production then moved to Sicily, specifically Palermo, Marsala, Trapani, and Cefalù. Filming concluded in December 2022.

Filming locations in Palermo included Palazzo Comitini, Palazzo Valguarnera-Gangi, Palazzo dei Normanni, Palazzo Alliata di Villafranca, Santa Maria dello Spasimo, Piazza Pretoria, Piazza Bellini, Piazza Verdi, Via Maqueda, and Corso Vittorio Emanuele.

== Release ==
The series premiered at the 18th Rome Film Festival on 23 October 2023. On 4 August 2023, it was announced that the first four episodes would be released on Disney+ on 25 October and the remaining four would be released on 1 November.

A teaser trailer for the series was released on 22 September 2023. The official trailer was released on 2 October, featuring the song "Durare" by Laura Pausini.

== Awards and nominations ==
Year	Award	Category	Result	Ref.
2024	Nastri D'Argento Grandi Serie	Best Drama Series	Won	
