= Santa Ninfa dei Crociferi =

Church in Palermo, Italy

Church of Saint Nympha
- Chiesa di Santa Ninfa dei Crociferi (in Italian)
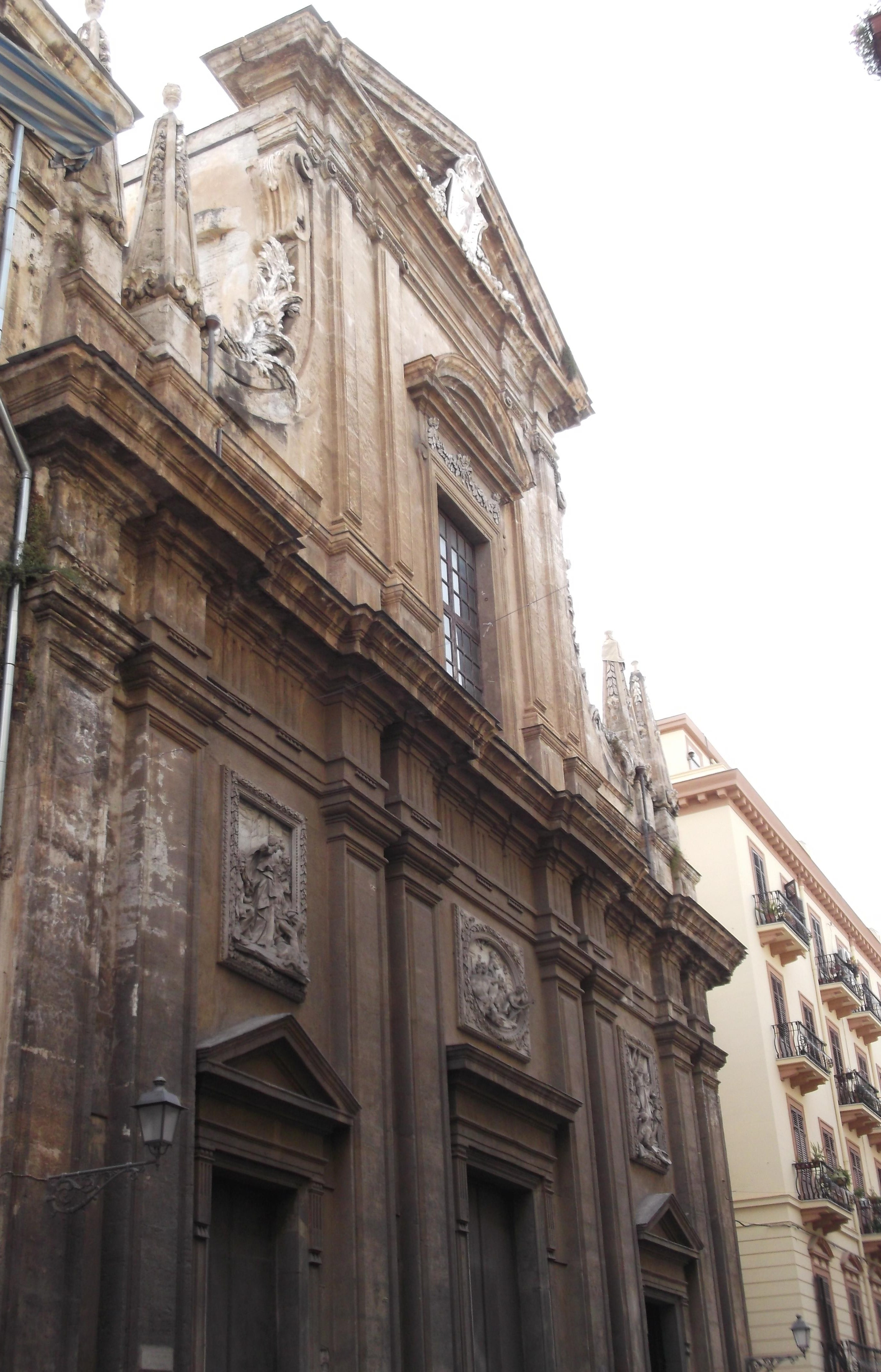
- Façade of the church

Religion
- Affiliation: Roman Catholic
- Province: Archdiocese of Palermo
- Rite: Roman Rite

Location
- Location: Palermo, Italy
- Interactive map of Church of Saint Nympha
- Coordinates: 38°06′59.8″N 13°21′37.6″E

Architecture
- Style: Sicilian Baroque, Mannerist
- Groundbreaking: 1601
- Completed: 1750

The Church of Saint Nympha (Italian: Chiesa di Santa Ninfa or Santa Ninfa dei Crociferi) is a Baroque-Mannerist church of Palermo. The facade rises on Via Maqueda, a block north of the central intersection known as the Quattro Canti, in the quarter of Seralcadi, within the historic centre of Palermo. The church belongs to the Camillians (also known as "Crociferi").

== History ==
The church is dedicated to one of the female patron saints of Palermo: Ninfa or Nympha who had lived in Palermo was putatively martyred for her faith in the 4th century. It is one of the first buildings erected after the opening of Via Maqueda, the second most important street of the city.

The order of the Camillians had been founded by the later canonized Camillus de Lellis in 1582, and rapidly spread throughout Italy. Its adherents, known for wearing cassocks with a red cross, and known as the Crociferi were in demand for their service in ministering to the sick.

Construction of the church began on 10 August 1601 with funds assigned by the Senate of Palermo and donations. Saint Camillus de Lellis attended this inauguration. In the same area the house of the Crociferi was erected.

The original design was probably prepared in Rome. In Palermo many architects were involved in the construction: Giovanni Macolino, Giacomo Amato, Giuseppe Clemente Mariani, Ferdinando Lombardo and Giuseppe Venanzio Marvuglia. The church was open in 1660, but because of financial difficulties, the construction was completed only in 1750 with the conclusion of the façade designed by Ferdinando Lombardo. The church houses many artworks of important artists.

Some relics of Saint Camillus are held in the church.

Sir John Acton was buried here after his death in 1811.

== Art ==
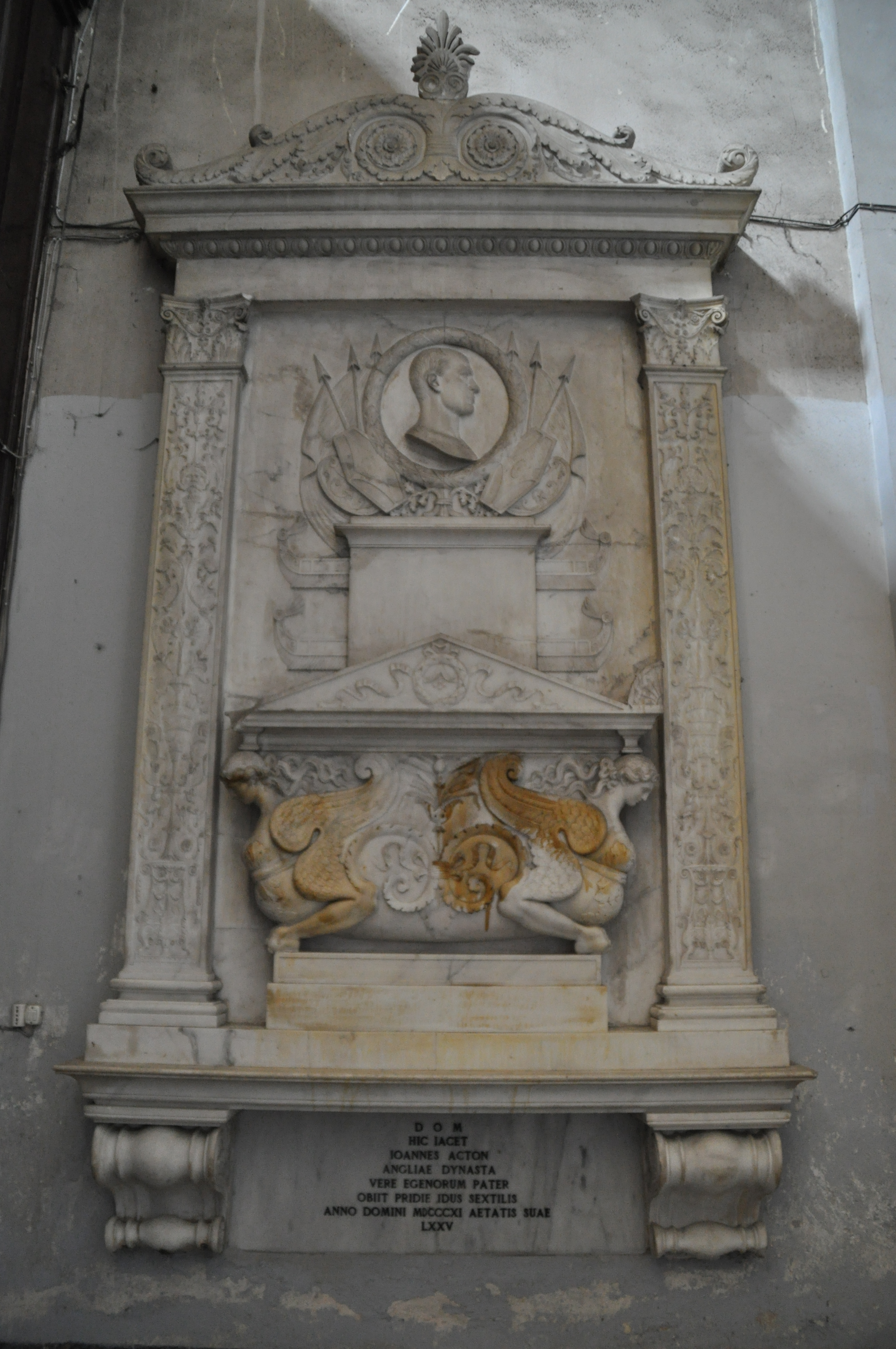
Funerary monument to Sir John Acton, 6th Baronet

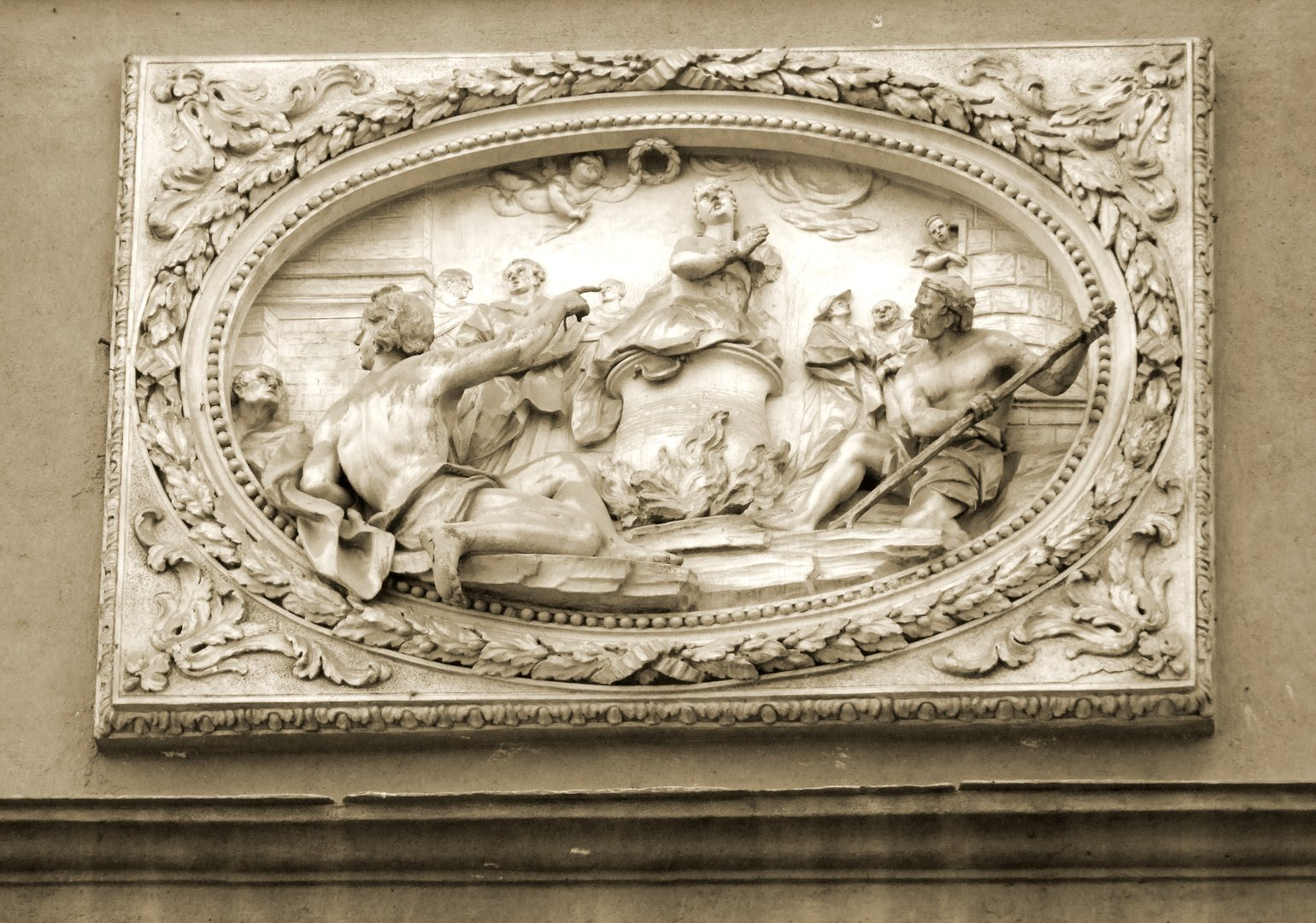
Facade: Martyrdom of Saint Nympha, Gaspare Firriolo

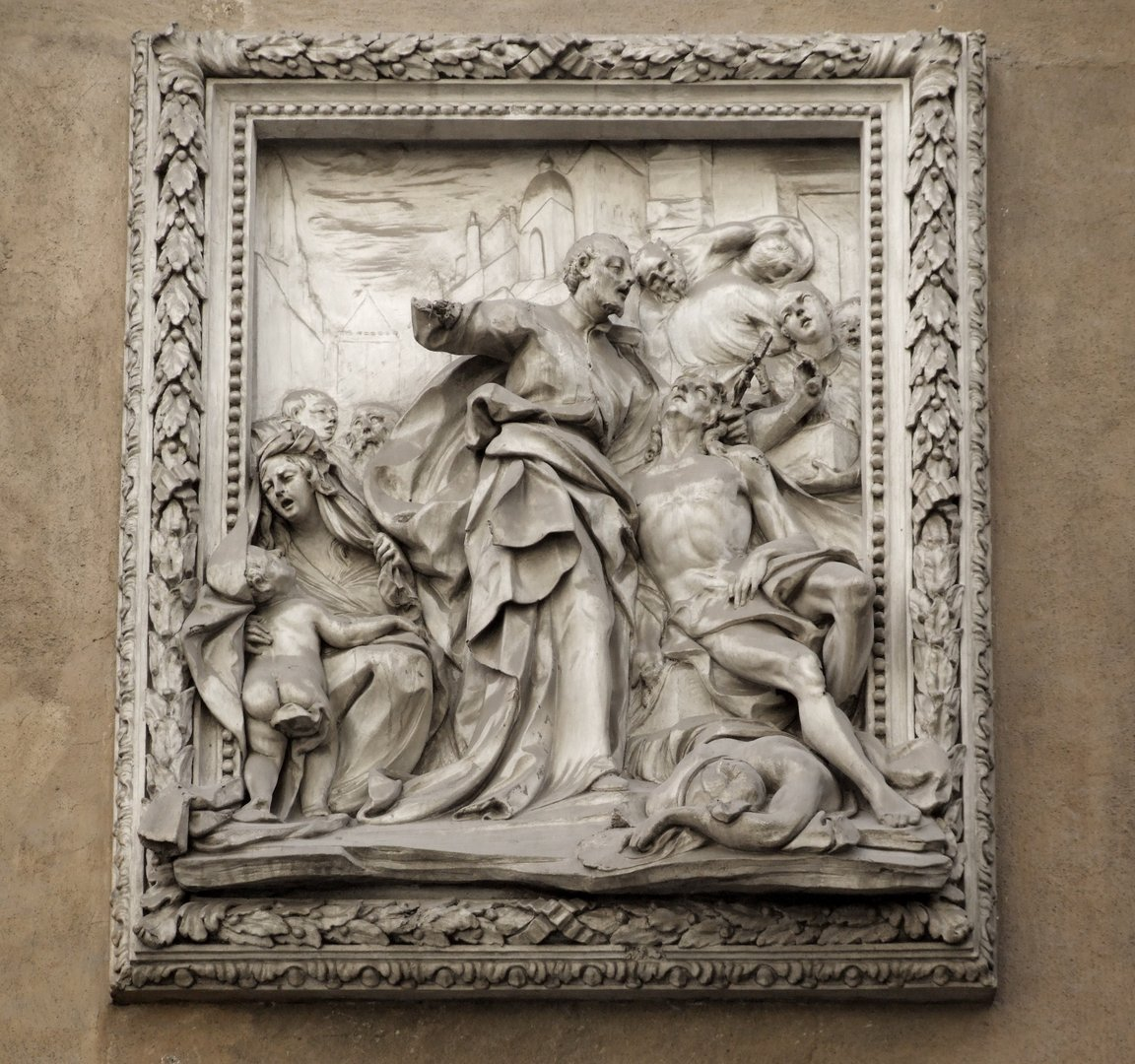
Facade: Saint Camillus takes care of the infirms, Vittorio Perez

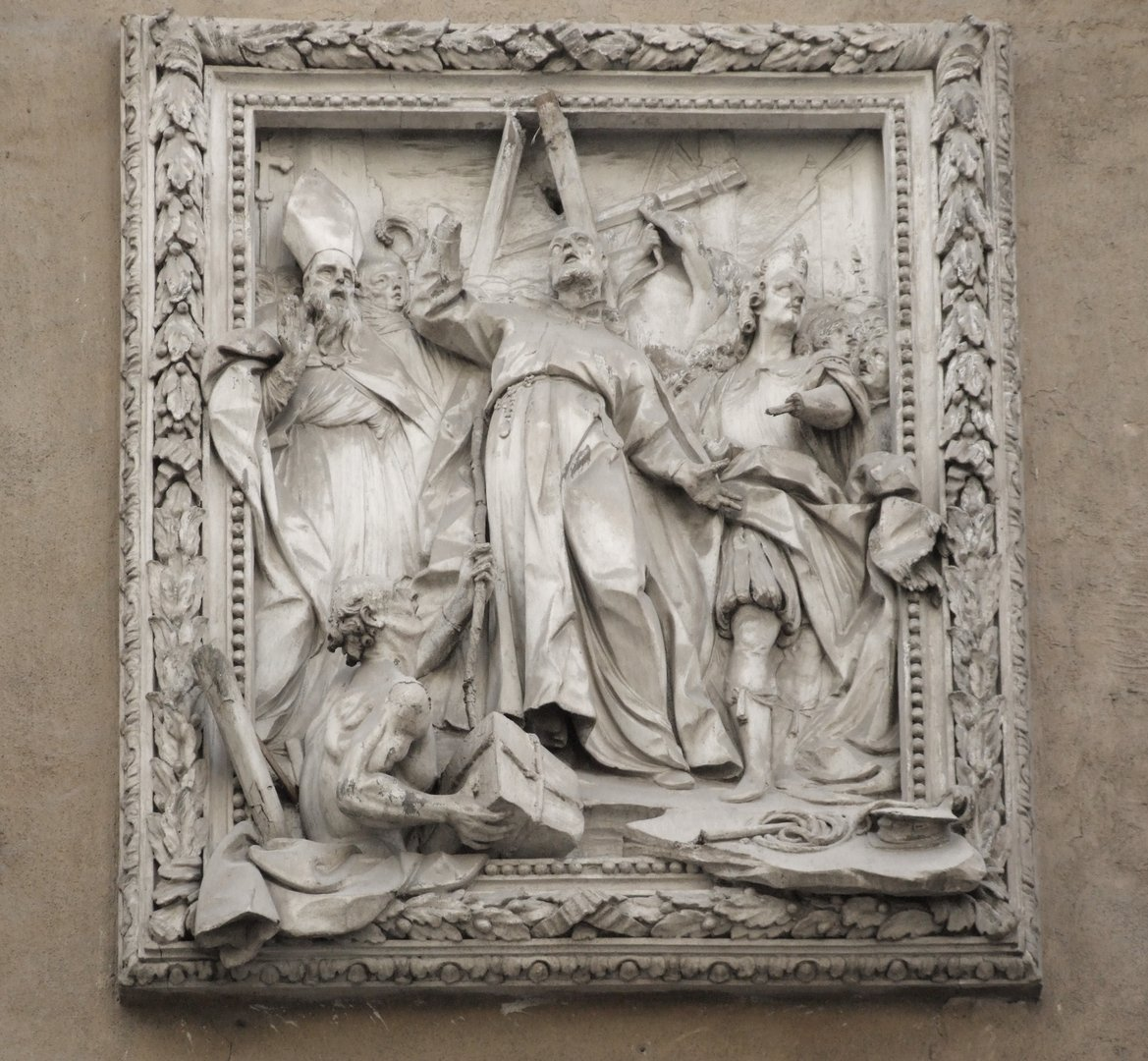
Facade: The groundbreaking of the church, Vittorio Perez

=== Paintings ===
Oil on canvas:

- Nympha and the other Virgins of Palermo with Saint Joseph, Mary and the Most Holy Trinity, Gioacchino Martorana
- Saint Camillus ascends to Heaven, Gaspare Serenario
- Death of Saint Joseph, Guglielmo Borremans
- Holy Family, Guglielmo Borremans
- Saint Joseph the Carpenter, Guglielmo Borremans
- Martyrdom of Saint Venantius, unknown author
- God the Father, unknown author

Panel painting:

- Our Lady of Health, unknown author

Frescoes:

- Saint Paul and the Triumph of the Cross, Gioacchino Martorana
- Saint Jerome, Gioacchino Martorana
- Saint Gregory the Great, Gioacchino Martorana
- Saint Augustine, Gioacchino Martorana
- Saint Ambrose, Gioacchino Martorana
- Saint Philip Neri in Glory, Alessandro D'Anna
- Saint Magdalene penitent, Alessandro D'Anna
- Saint Liberalis, unknown author
- Saint Evansia, unknown author
- Adoration of the Bronze Serpent, unknown author
- Assumption of the Virgin, unknown author

=== Sculptures ===
High reliefs:

- Martyrdom of Saint Nympha, Gaspare Firriolo
- Saint Camillus takes care of the infirms, Vittorio Perez
- The groundbreaking of the church, Vittorio Perez

Statues:

- Saint John the Baptist, Giacomo Serpotta
- Mary Magdalene, Giacomo Serpotta
- Virgin Mary, Giacomo Serpotta
- Our Lady of Sorrows, Giuseppe Milanti
- Simeon, Andrea Sulfarello
- Jeremiah, Gaspare La Farina
- Heart of Jesus, unknown author
- Justice, unknown author
- Penance, unknown author

The church houses several funeral monuments.

== See also ==
- Seralcadi
- Via Maqueda
- Churches in Palermo
