= Palazzo Speciali Raffadali =

Coordinates: 38.11384°N 13.35998°E

The Palazzo Speciale Raffadeli is a Gothic-style aristocratic palace located on Via Giuseppe Mario Puglia #2, a block north of the church of Santa Chiara all'Albergaria in the ancient quarter of Albergaria, in central Palermo, region of Sicily, Italy.

== History ==
The stone palace was commissioned in 1468 by Pietro Speciale, praetor of Palermo. At the time it was adjacent to the medieval town walls and included large gardens. The facade maintains gothic windows, with those facing the piazzetta Pietro Speciale consisting of mullioned ogival windows. Above the large portal are the coat of arms of the order of San Giacomo della Spada. In the 17th century, when Eleonora Speciale married the Prince of Raffadali, the palace added this surname to the title. The portal leads to a large central atrium with a 17th-century entrance staircase. The interior of the palace has been extensively rebuilt over the centuries. From the piazzetta one can seem where windows and portals were walled up. It is still owned by the descendants of this family.
