= Sant'Orsola, Palermo =

Roman Catholic Church in Palermo, Italy

Church of Saint Ursula
- Chiesa di Sant'Orsola (in Italian)
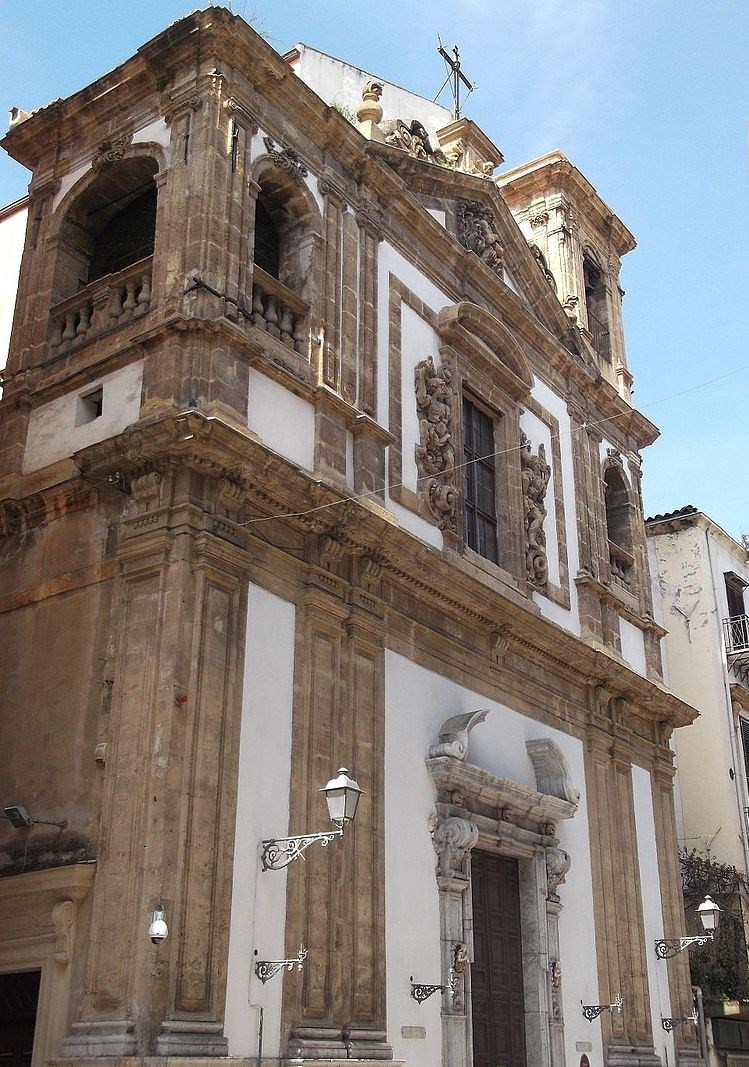
- Façade of the church

Religion
- Affiliation: Roman Catholic
- Province: Archdiocese of Palermo
- Rite: Roman Rite

Location
- Location: Palermo, Italy
- Interactive map of Church of Saint Ursula
- Coordinates: 38°06′46.75″N 13°21′46.73″E

Architecture
- Style: Sicilian Baroque
- Completed: 1662

The Church of Saint Ursula of the Blacks (Italian: Chiesa di Sant'Orsola dei Negri) is a Baroque-style, Roman Catholic church located in the central Via Maqueda #110, adjacent to the Palazzo Comitini, in the quarter of the Albergaria, within the historic centre of Palermo, Region of Sicily, Italy.

== History ==
The church was built for the "Compagnia di Sant'Orsola" (Brotherhood of Saint Ursula), a lay confraternity founded in 1564 in the neighboring church of Santi Quaranta Martiri Pisani al Casalotto. The tag dei Negri refers to the black gowns worn by the members of the Confraternity during processions.

The church was open to the public in 1662. The nave, and maybe the entire building, was designed by Giacomo Amato. In 1672, the church was refurbished with a rich decoration of stucco and painting. The nave ceiling was frescoed with a depiction of the Glory of St Ursula by Gaspare Serenari. In the following century another refurbishment was made. The stucco decorations of Giacomo Serpotta for some of the chapels include multiple macabre skeletal representations.

== Art ==
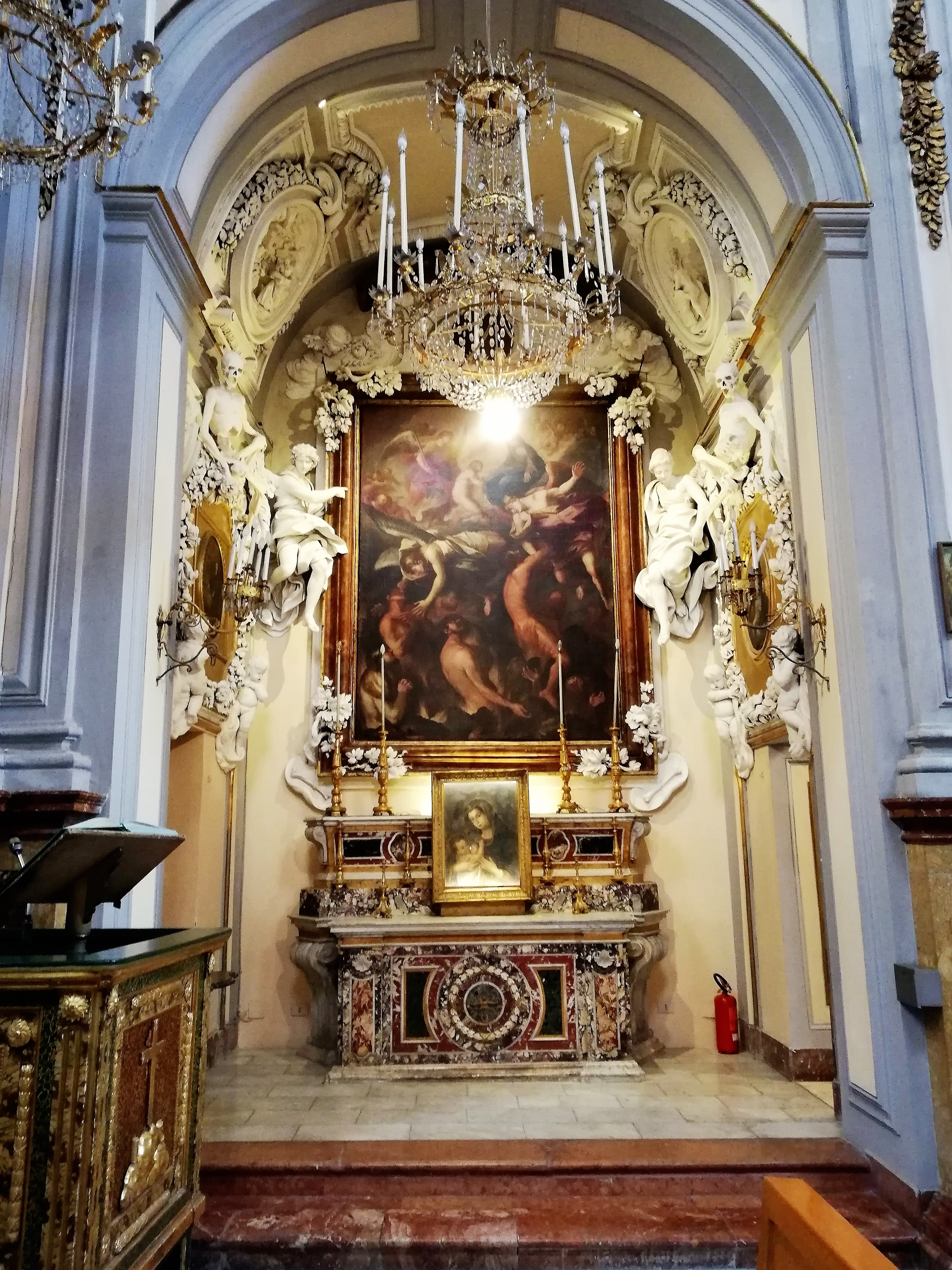
Chapel for Prayers for the Souls in Purgatory, with memento mori by Serpotta

Oil on canvas:

- Saint Anne and child Mary, school of Pietro Novelli
- Martyrdom of Saint Ursula, Pietro Novelli
- Madonna with Salvator Mundi, Pietro Novelli
- Jesus Christ with the Cross, Pietro Novelli
- The Pool of Bethesda, flanking apse canvas by Antonio Manno
- Descent of Christ into Limbo, flanking apse canvas by Antonio Manno
- Deposition with the Three Marys, main altarpiece by Giuseppe Patania
- Saint Jerome, Zoppo di Gangi
- Salvation of the Souls of Purgatory, unknown author
- Holy Family, unknown author

Frescoes:

- Assumption of the Virgin, Gaspare Serenari
- Glory of Saint Ursula, Gaspare Serenari
- Faith and Charity, Gaspare Serenari

The pillars are decorated with ovals representing the patron saints of Palermo: Lucy, Christina, Agatha, Ninfa, Olivia and Rosalia by the workshop of Pietro Novelli.
