= Oratorio della Carità di San Pietro =

Baroque prayer room or oratory

Oratory of Charity of St Peter
- Oratorio della Carità di San Pietro
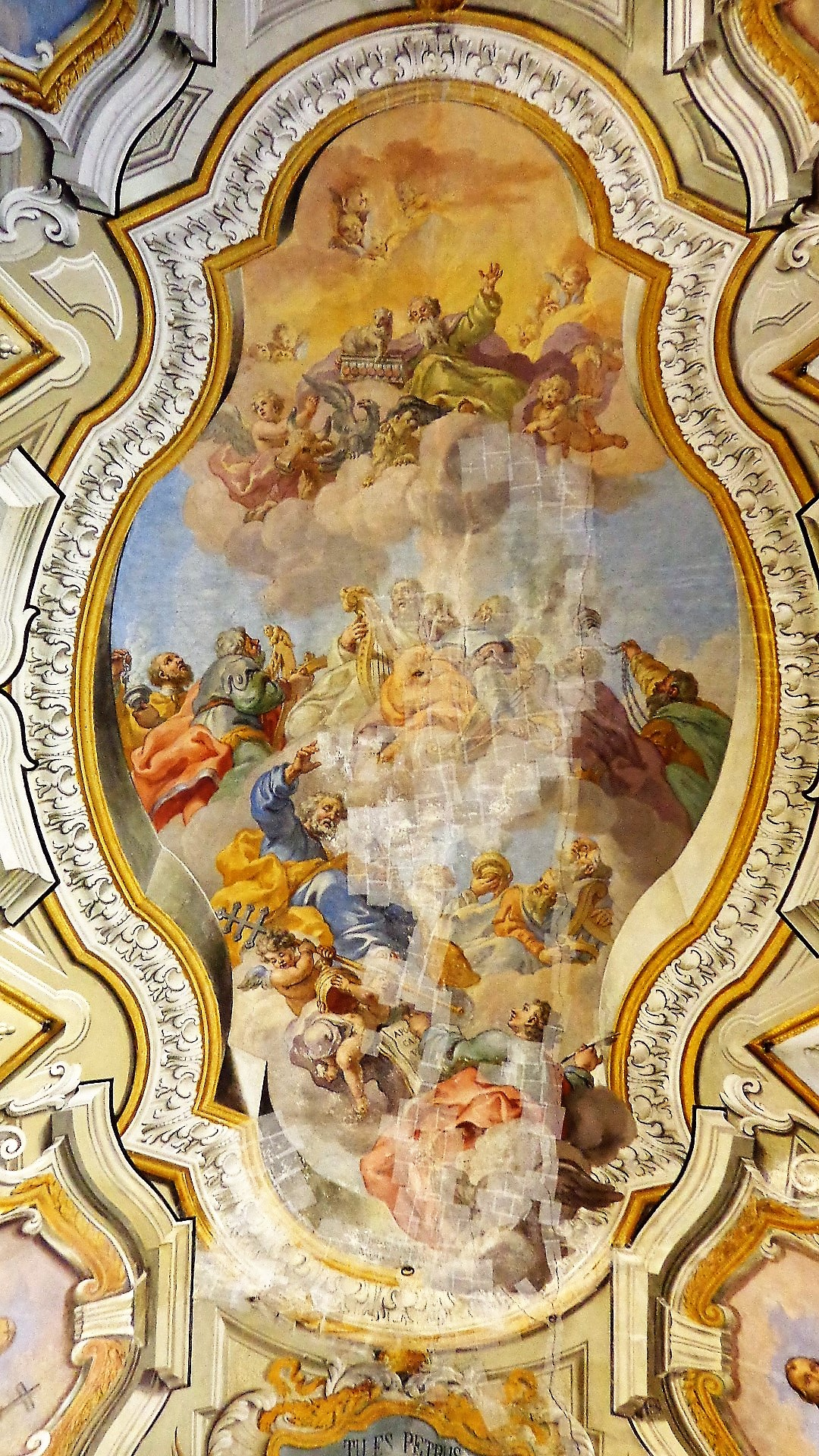
- Interior of Oratory

Religion
- Affiliation: Roman Catholic
- Province: Archdiocese of Palermo
- Rite: Roman Rite

Location
- Location: Palermo, Italy
- Interactive map of Oratory of Charity of St Peter
- Coordinates: 38°06′59″N 13°21′39″E

The Oratorio della Carità di San Pietro is a Baroque prayer room oratory located on Via Maqueda #206, adjacent to the church of Santa Ninfa dei Crociferi, in the ancient quarter of Seralcadi of Palermo, region of Sicily, Italy.

== History ==
The oratory was founded by a small congregation, founded by the cleric Giovanni Merlo in 1736, with among its aims, ransoming priests that had been kidnapped by Saracen pirates, and ministering to their infirmities and burial.

The oratory is accessed through the cloister of the convent attached to Santa Ninfa. The oratory was frescoed in 1738 by Guglielmo Borremans and his studio. The anteroom ceiling is aptly frescoed, for a congregation liberating prisoners, with a Liberation of St Peter from Jail. Another fresco depicts a Glory of St Peter. The walls are rich in Rococo decoration with quadrature. In false niches are depictions of the cardinal virtues of charity, faith, prudence, and justice; as well as depictions of Saints Francis, Acacio, Paolino di Nola, Aniano, and Rimberto.

== Gallery ==
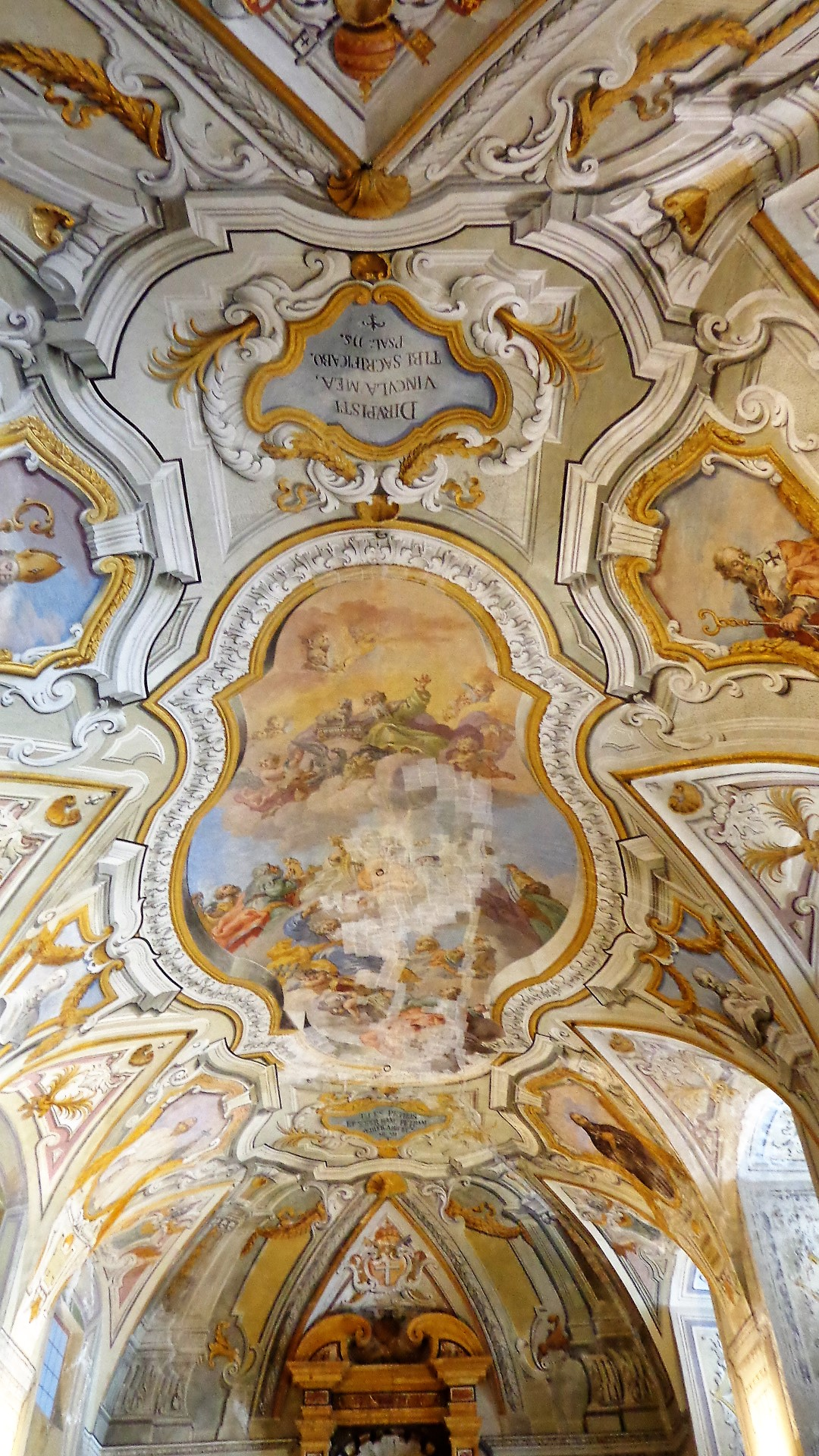
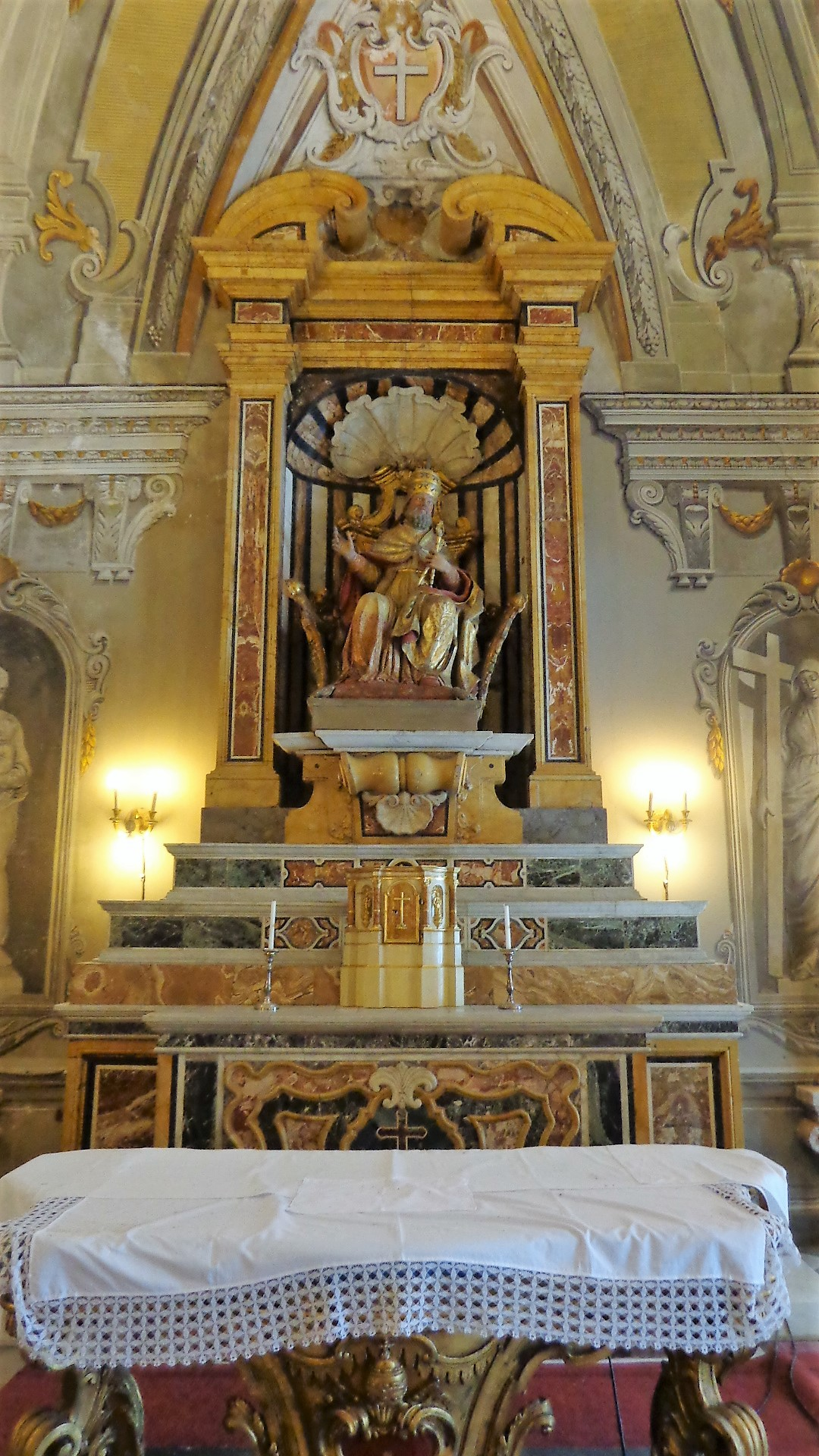
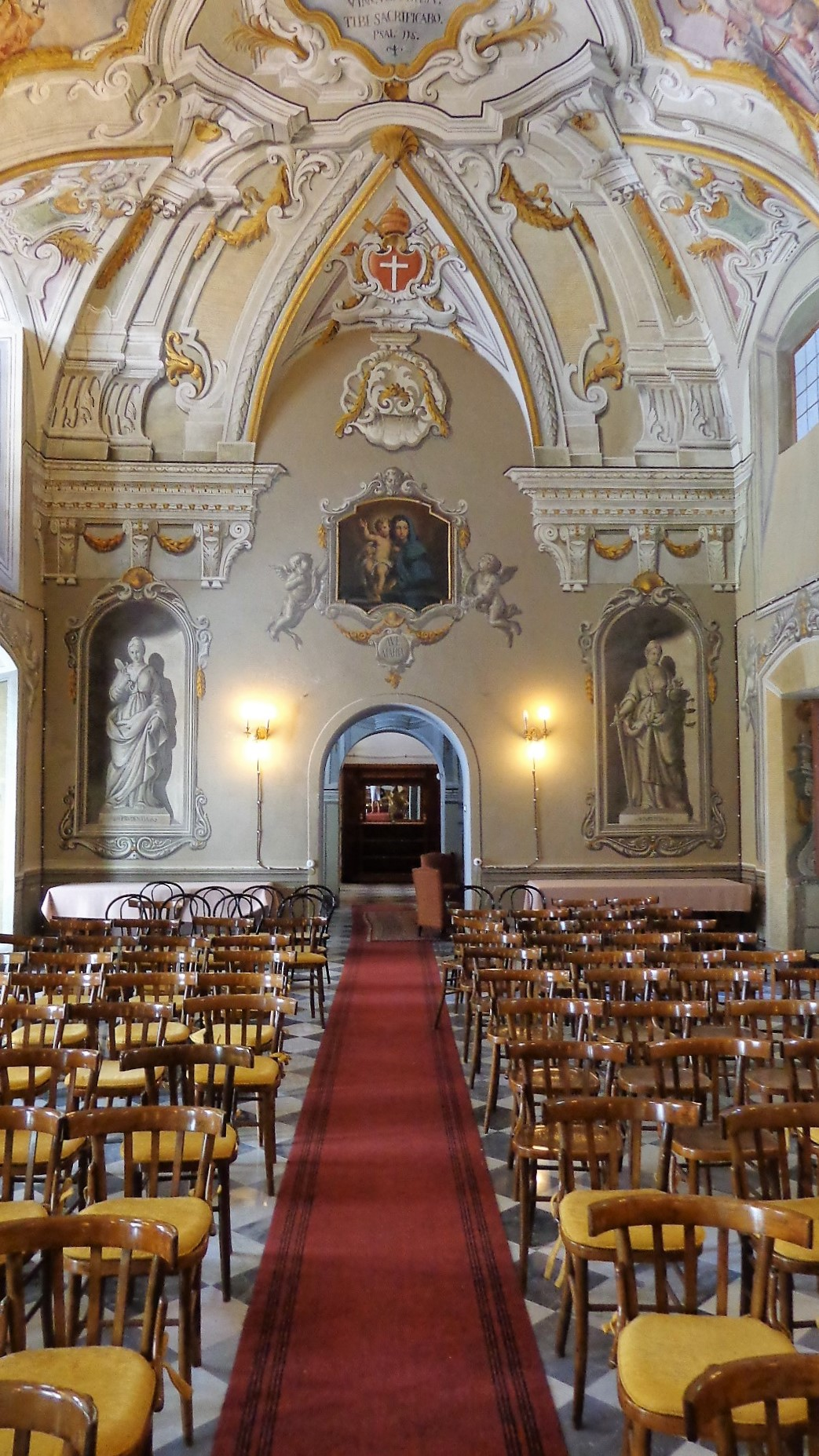
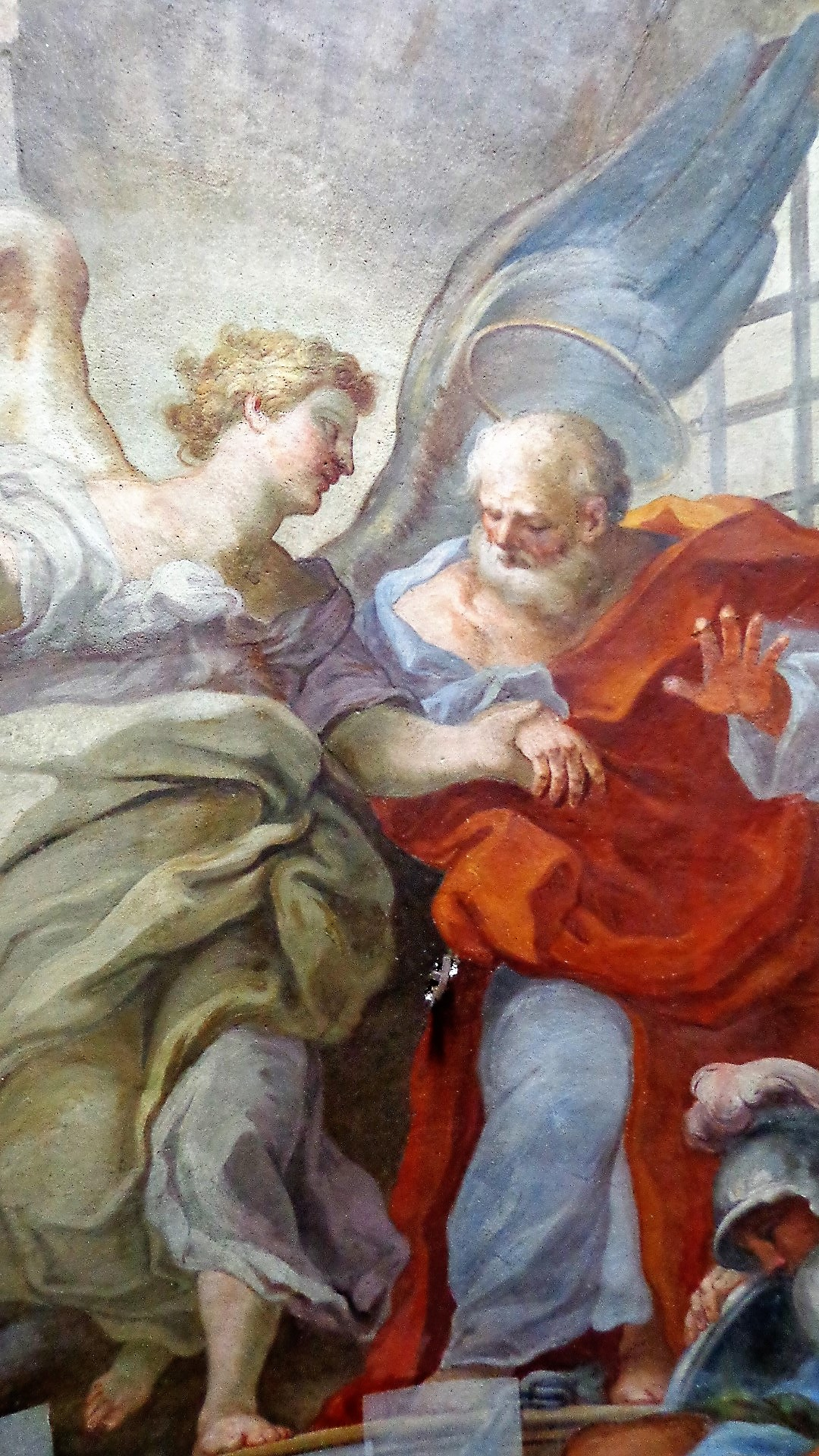

== Bibliography ==
- Guida istruttiva per potersi conoscere ... tutte le magnificenze ... della Città di Palermo, Volume 4, by Gaspare Palermo, published at the Reale Stamperia of Palermo (1816)
