= Via Maqueda =

Street in Palermo

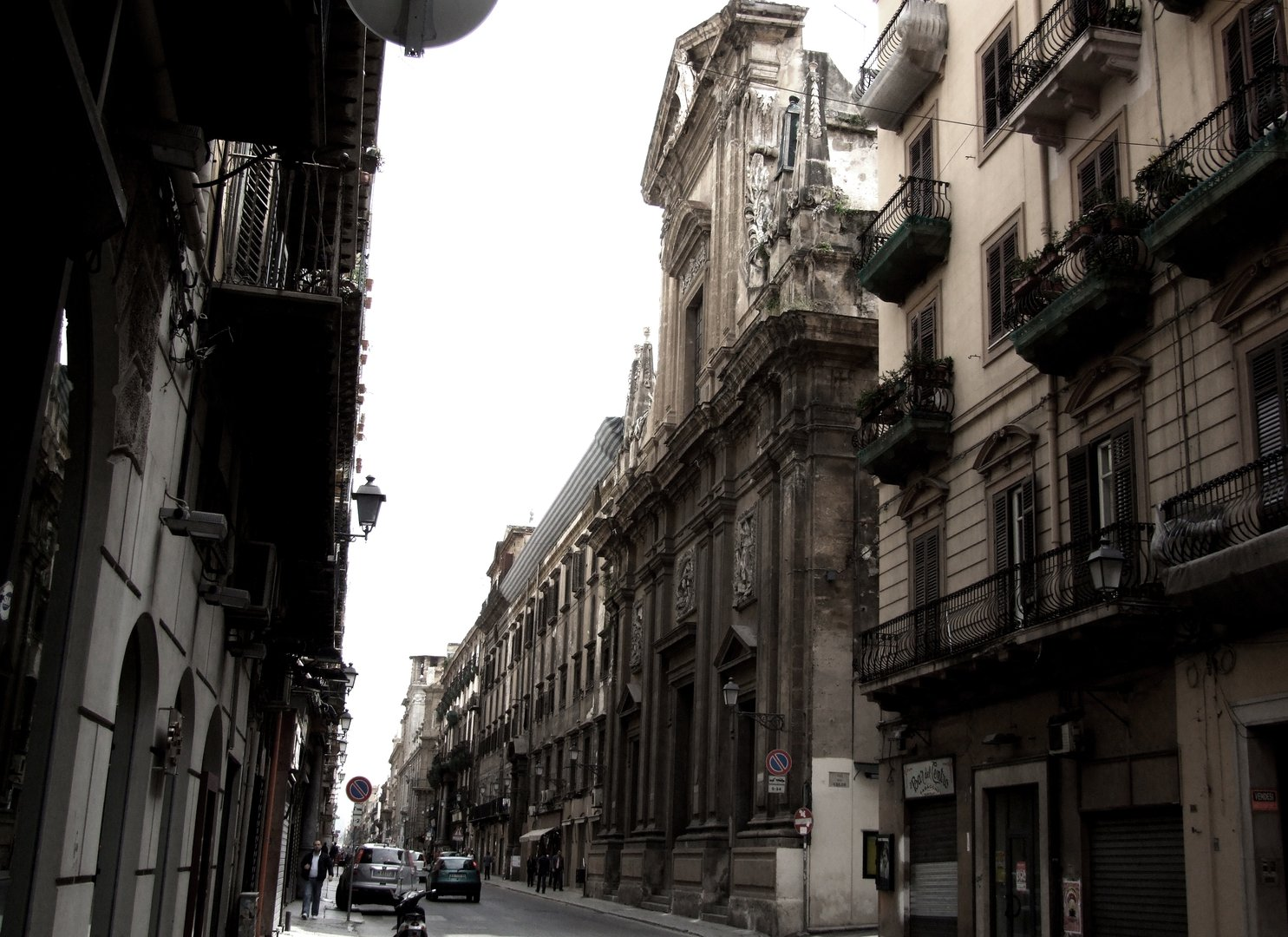
- Via Maqueda, facade of Santa Ninfa dei Crociferi.
- Interactive map of Via Maqueda
- Former name: Strada Nuova
- Length: 1.5 km (0.93 mi)
- Location: Palermo, Sicily, Italy
- Coordinates: Quattro Canti: 38°06′57″N 13°21′41″E

Via Maqueda (Italian pronunciation: [ˈviːa maˈkwɛːda]), also known as Strada Nuova ('New Street'), is an important street of Palermo, Sicily. Together with the Cassaro, it represents the main axis of the historic centre and provides access to a number of important sights, including Teatro Massimo and Fontana Pretoria. The street is named after the Viceroy of Sicily Bernardino de Cárdenas y Portugal, Duque de Maqueda.

== History ==
In the late sixteenth century the opening of the street was decided. It was conceived as an axis destined to cross the most ancient road of Palermo, the millennial Cassaro. The creation of the street addressed the need of a more sliding traffic and the requests of the nobility, eager to have new spaces for its buildings.

The work was designed in 1577 and completed in 1599, during the period of the Viceroy Maqueda. On 24 July 1600 the street was inaugurated.

== Structure ==
The street is perfectly straight from Piazza Verdi, near Teatro Massimo, to Porta di Vicari, near the Palermo Centrale railway station. With the Cassaro, Via Maqueda forms the famous Baroque intersection known as Quattro Canti (Piazza Vigliena). The two streets are also jointly called Croce Barocca ('Baroque Cross').

== Transport ==
During daylight hours, the street is pedestrian in the stretch from Piazza Verdi to Quattro Canti.

== Places of interest ==
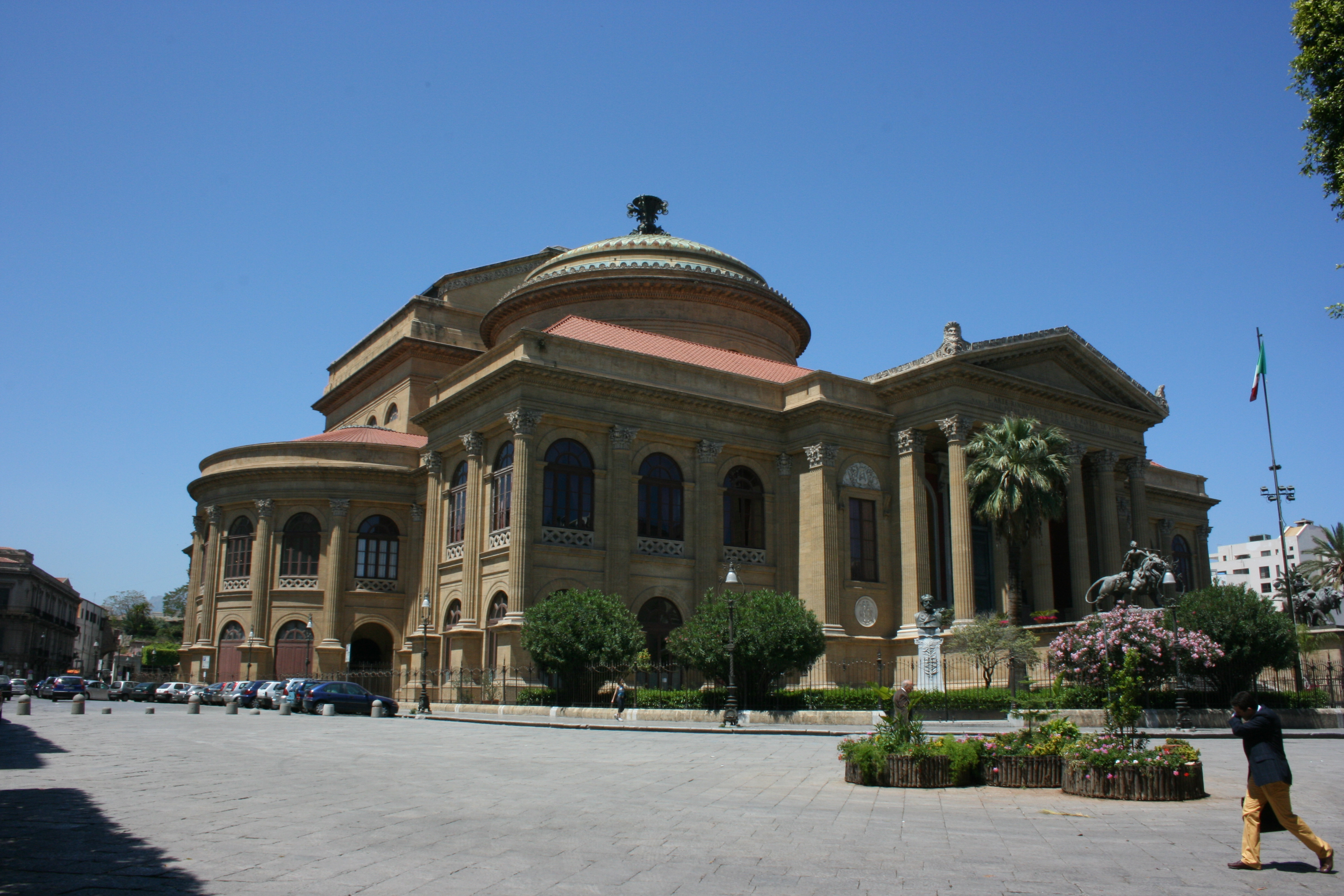
Teatro Massimo

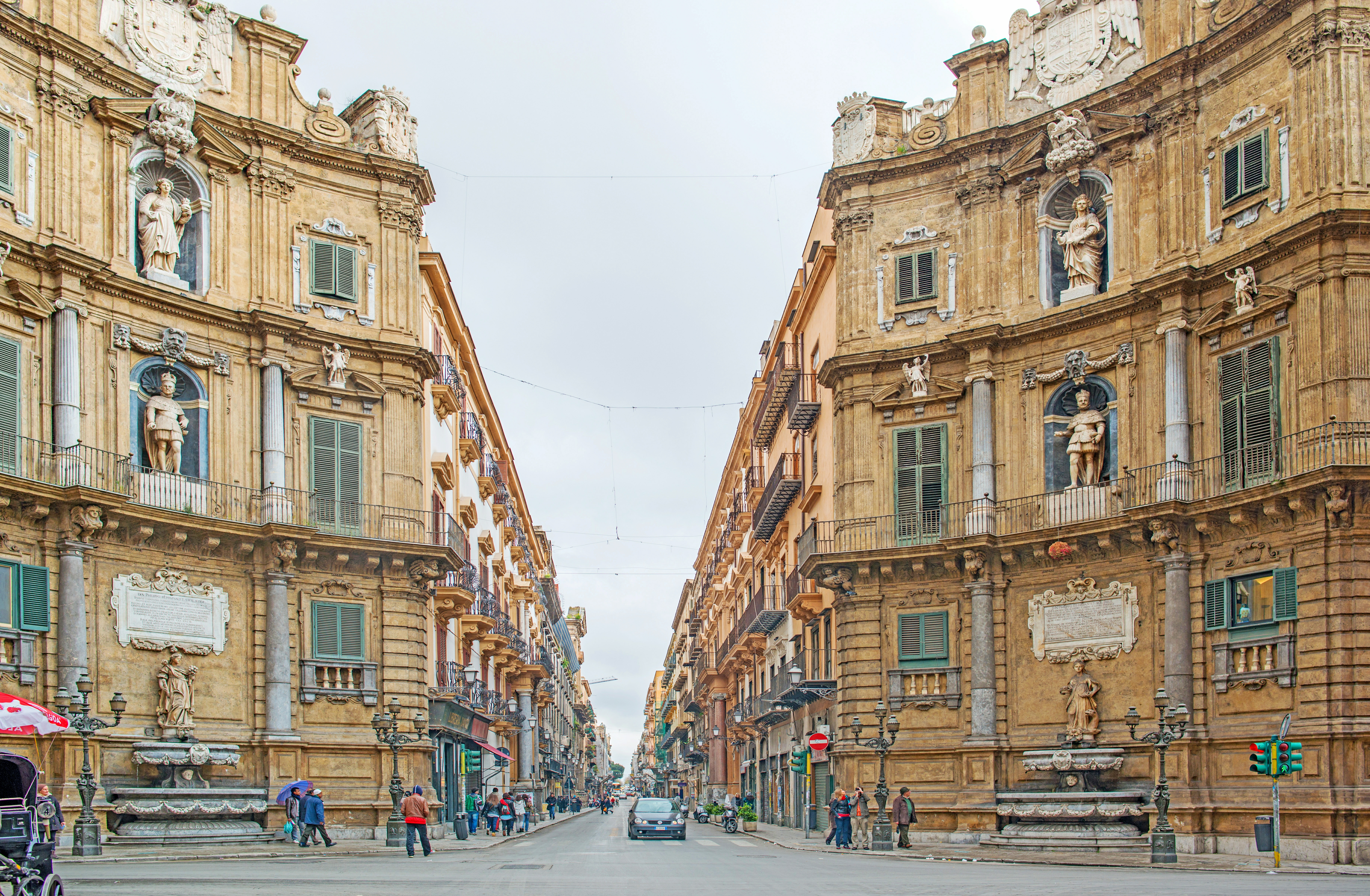
Quattro Canti

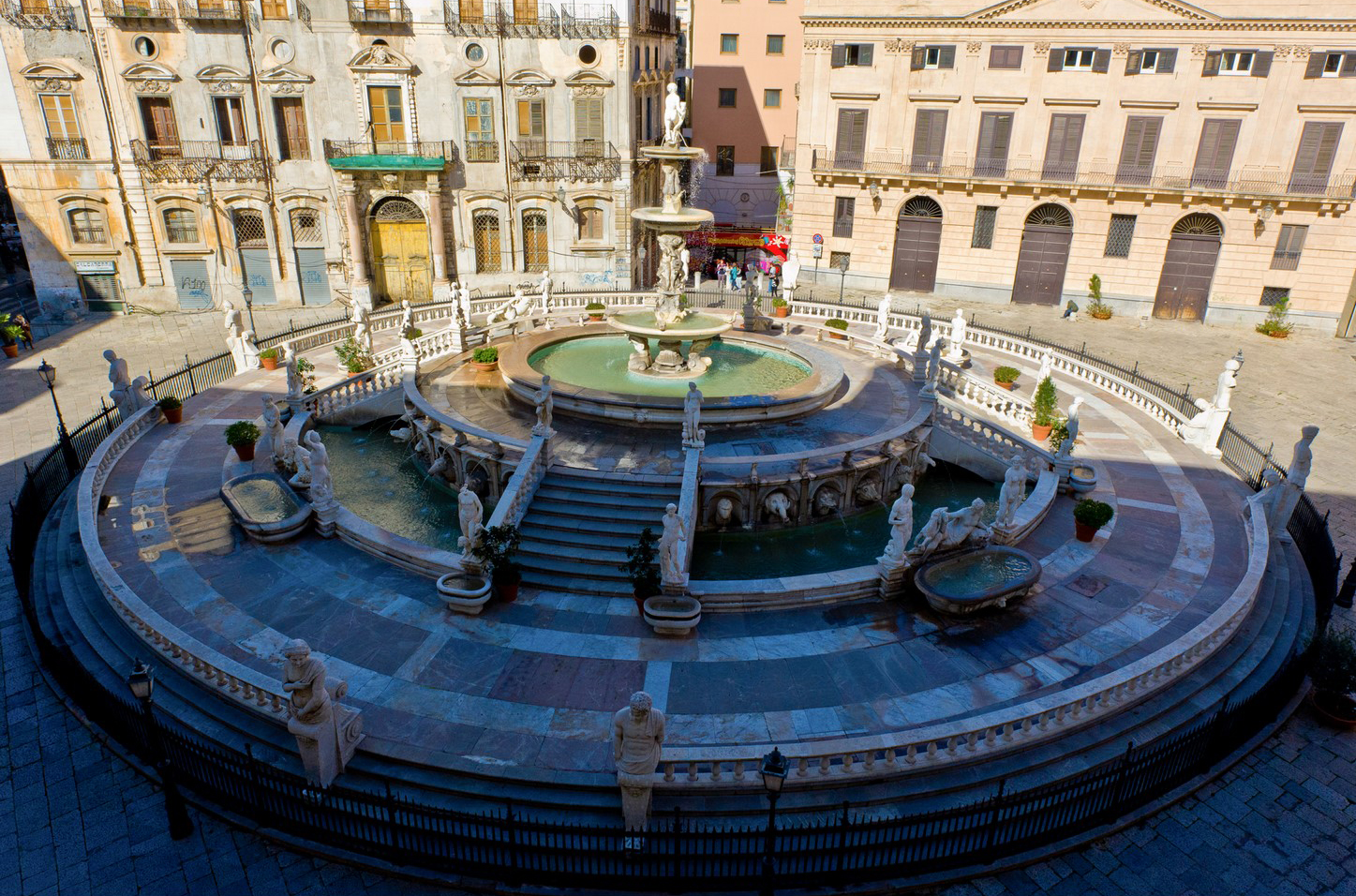
Fontana Pretoria

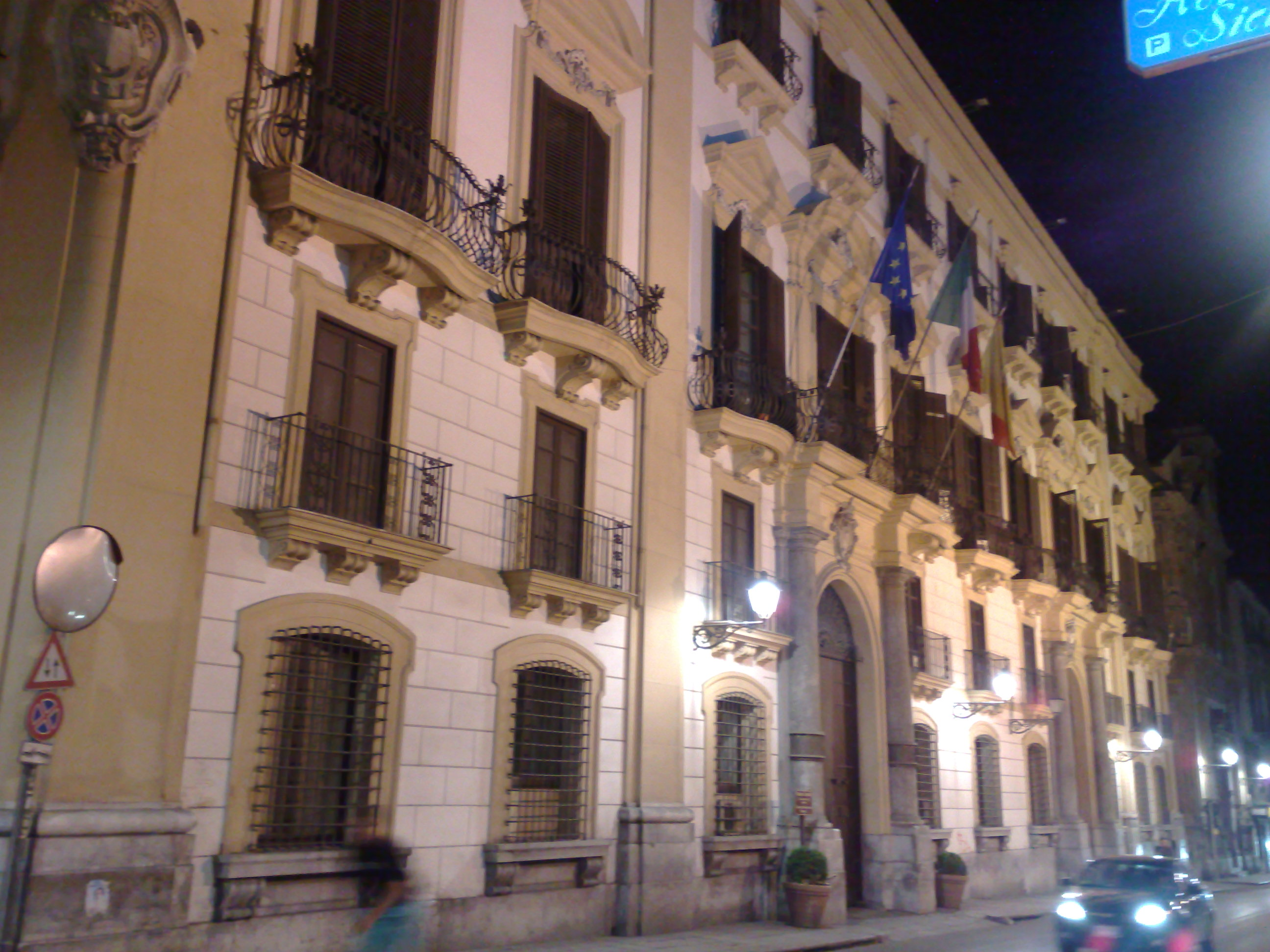
Palazzo Comitini

Right side	Number	Number	Left side
Piazza Verdi
Teatro Massimo			
			Palazzo Majorana di Leonvago
Palazzo Sartorio Grassellini			Church of Santa Maria del Soccorso
			Palazzo Scordia Mazzarino
			Palazzo Maurigi
			Palazzo Napoli
			Galleria delle Vittorie
Church of Santa Ninfa dei Crociferi			Palazzo Judica
Oratorio della Carità di San Pietro			Palazzo Di Maggio Gramignani
		217	Palazzo Costantino
Palazzo Starabba di Rudinì			
Cassaro	Quattro Canti		Cassaro
Church of San Giuseppe dei Teatini			Palazzo Bordonaro
Church of San Giuseppe dei Teatini			Piazza Pretoria (Fontana Pretoria)
			Palazzo Pretorio
Casa dei Padri Teatini (Faculty of Jurisprudence)			Piazza Bellini (Church of San Cataldo and Martorana)
			Casa Martorana
			Church of San Nicola da Tolentino (Communal archive)
Palazzo Busacca			
Palazzo Celesia	110		
Church of Sant'Orsola			
Palazzo Gravina di Comitini		93	Palazzo Balsamo
Palazzo Filangieri di Santa Flavia			Palazzo Sant'Elia
Palazzo Chiarandà			
			Church of Maria Santissima Assunta delle Carmelitane Scalze
Palazzo Filangieri di Cutò			
Porta di Vicari

== See also ==
- Cassaro
- Porta di Vicari
- Quattro Canti
