= Antonio Manno =

Italian painter (1739–1810)

Antonio Manno (1739 – 1810) was an Italian painter of the Neoclassical style, active mainly in his Sicily.

== Biography ==
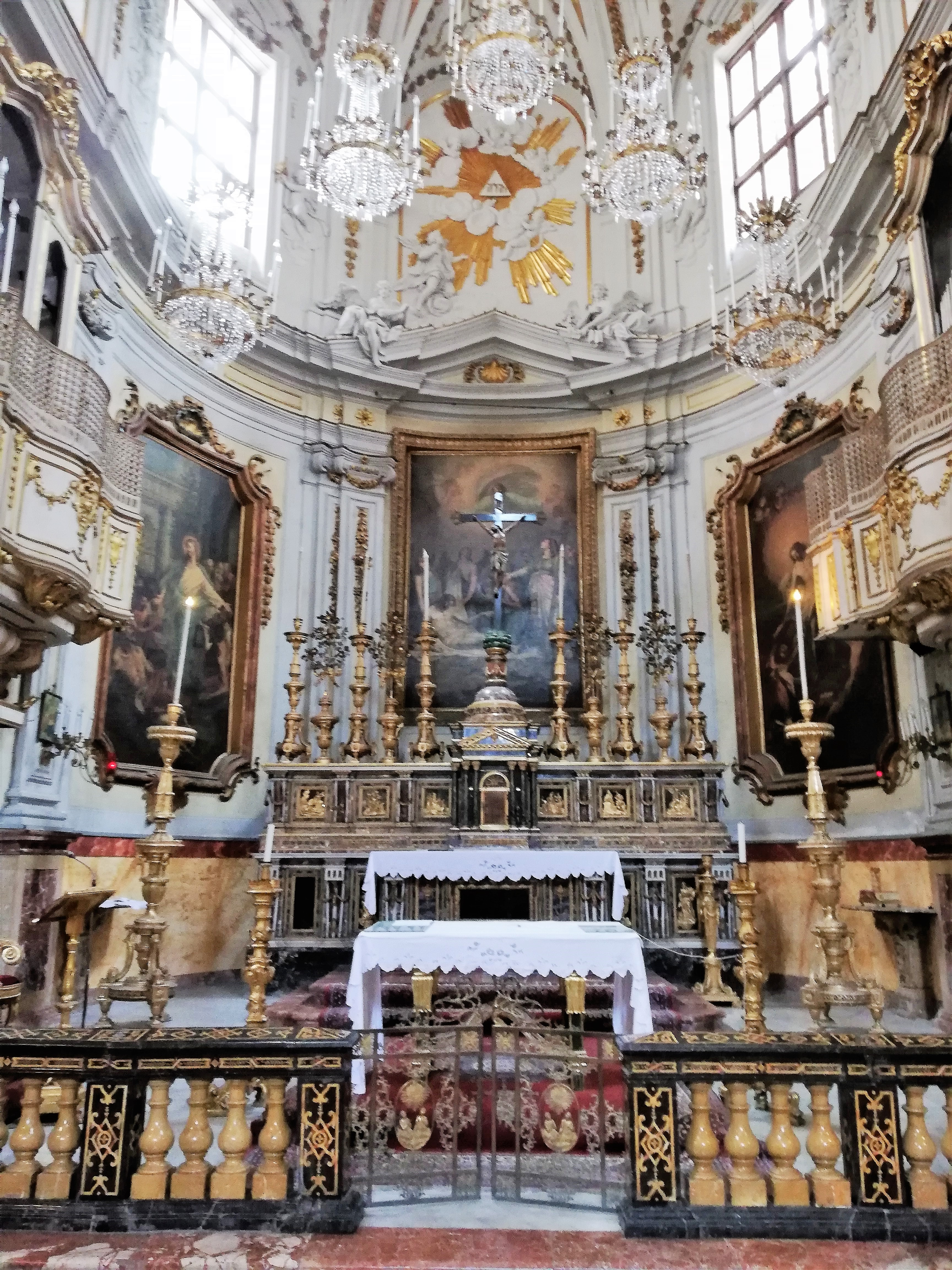
Two canvases by Manno flanking the main altar in church of Sant'Orsola in Palermo

He trained in his native Palermo initially with Vito d'Anna. Among Antonio's works in Sicily and Malta include altarpieces for the Nicosia Cathedral; and frescoes in Sant'Ignazio all'Olivella (1790), the Cathedral of Mdina (1790-1794), and the church of the Collegio di Santa Maria del Carmine (1775).

Antonio had two younger brothers who also became painters: Vincenzo (died 1821) and Francesco (1752-1831). Vincenzo worked often with Antonio after 1780. Antonio worked with his older brother in Palermo until 1786, but then he moved to a successful career in Rome, where he gained many commissions, first working under Pompeo Batoni, but in 1800 named painter of the Apostolic Palaces by Pope Pius VI. Another early pupil of Manno was Vincenzo Riolo.
