= Stefania Auci =

Italian writer

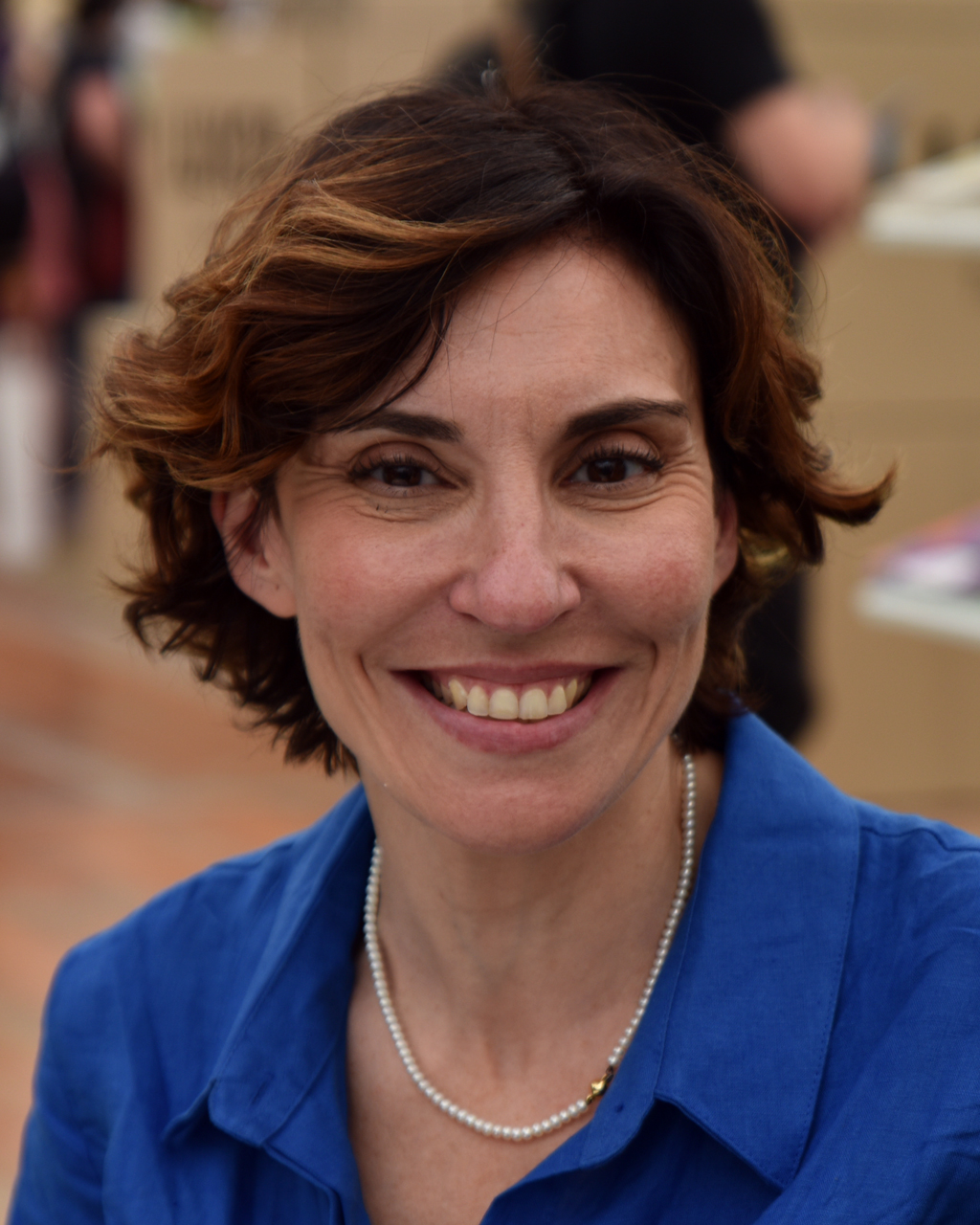
- Auci in 2022
- Born: 21 November 1974 (age 50); Trapani, Italy
- Occupation: Writer

Stefania Auci (born 21 November 1974) is an Italian author.

== Life and career ==
Born in Trapani, Auci studied at the liceo classico and graduated in law at the University of Palermo. After working at the Florence courthouse as a court clerk, she moved back to Palermo, where she works as a special-needs teacher. After several short stories, she made her novel debut in 2015 with Florence.

Auci had her breakout in 2019 with The Florios of Sicily (Italian: I leoni di Sicilia), an historical novel about the Florio family, which after having been rejected by two publishers was a surprise best seller, selling over one million copies and being released in 35 countries. In 2021, she released a sequel, The Triumph of the Lions (Italian: L'inverno dei leoni), which won the Premio Bancarella.

A streaming series adaption of the novel, titled The Lions of Sicily, was announced in 2022; produced by Disney+ and directed by Paolo Genovese, it stars Michele Riondino, Miriam Leone, Donatella Finocchiaro and Vinicio Marchioni.
