= Giulio Lasso =

Italian architect

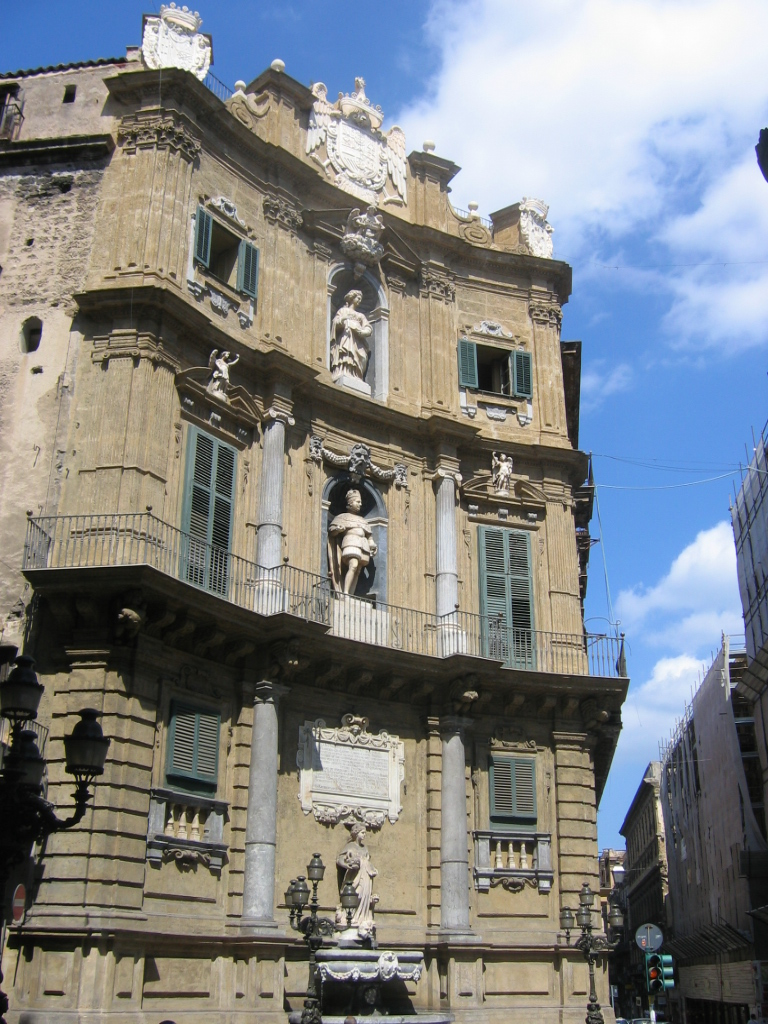
Early Sicilian Baroque: Quattro Canti, Palermo built ca. 1610.

Giulio Lassi, also known as Lasso and Scalzo (born before 1569; died 1612) was an Italian sculptor and architect, best known for his work in Palermo, Sicily. He was born, presumably in Rome, from Giovanni Domenico Lassi, a carpenter, and Camilla de Roberti; after the death of Giovanni Domenico, his mother married Giovanni di Lorenzo, called "the Moretto", also a carpenter, on April 25, 1569.

His younger step-brother Orazio Borgianni (born 1574), a painter, was trained by Lasso, as Giovanni Baglione referred in his biography of Orazio, published in 1642. Baglione also affirms that Giulio took the surname of "Scalzo" when he was a pupil of the sculptor Ludovico Scalza, and refers that he finally moved to Sicily.

Lasso's most famous works are the statue of St. James the Great, in the Dome of Messina (destroyed during the 2nd World War) and the Quattro Canti, an eight sided piazza in the centre of Palermo. The result of a road straightening and widening scheme, the Quattri Canti is one of Sicily's first examples of the Baroque style of architecture, and is also an early example of architectural town planning.

Lasso did not live to see its completion and the project was eventually finished under the supervision of Mariano Smiriglio, who was the architect of the Palermo Senate.

== Bibliography ==
Marco Gallo, "Una modesta proposta ai "lassisti". Note su Giulio Lassi (o Lasso) detto "Scalzo" (ante 1569-1612), fratellastro di Borgianni, e sul monumento Pasqualini di Ludovico Scalza", in "Orazio Borgianni. Bilanci e nuovi orizzonti", a cura di G. Papi e Y. Primarosa, Roma, 2022, pp. 50-72

== Link ==
https://www.academia.edu/90431759/Una_modesta_proposta_ai_lassisti_Note_su_Giulio_Lassi_o_Lasso_detto_Scalzo_ante_1569_1612_fratellastro_di_Borgianni_e_sul_monumento_Pasqualini_di_Ludovico_Scalza
