= Galleria delle Vittorie, Palermo =

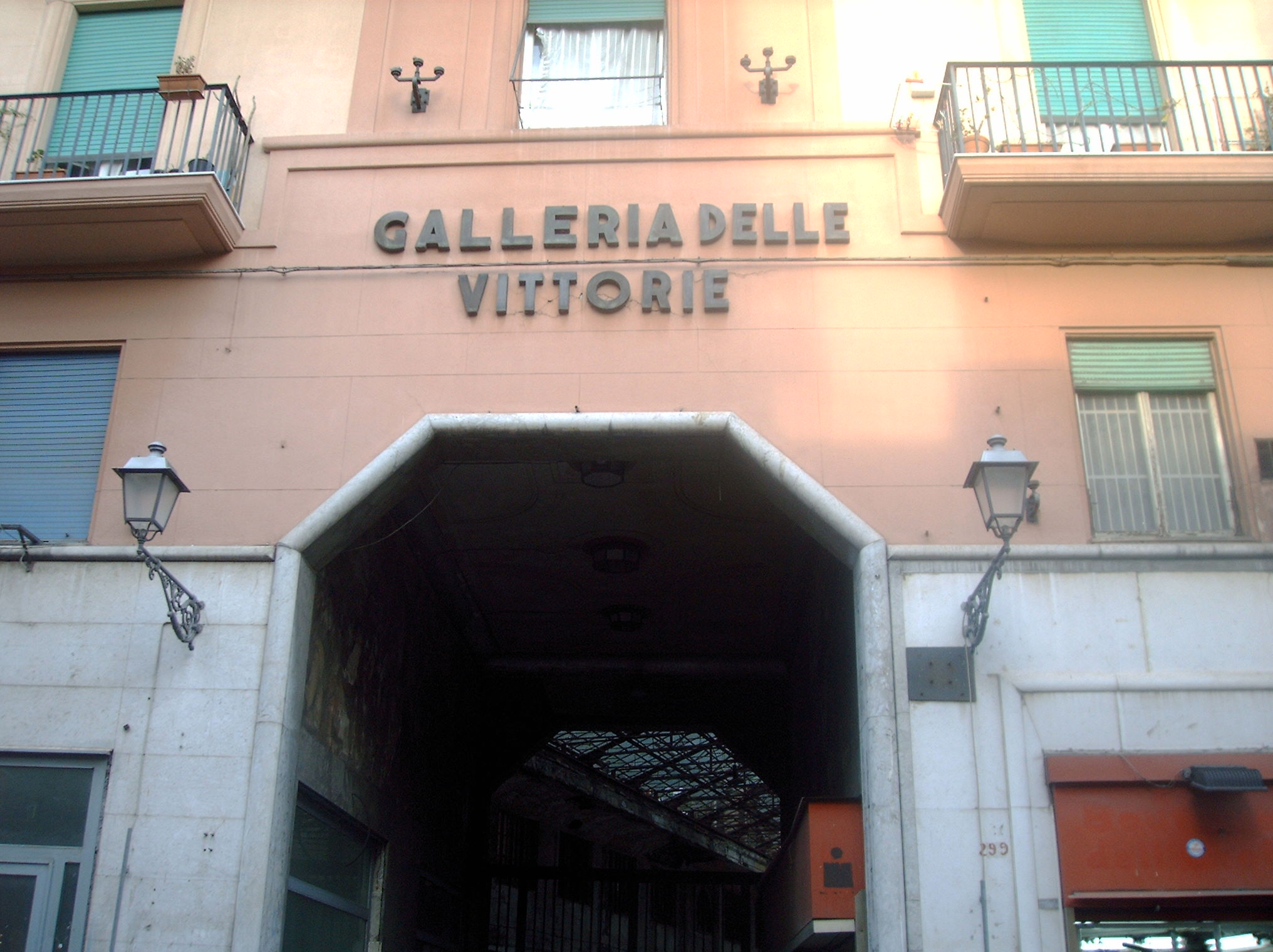
Gallery entrance

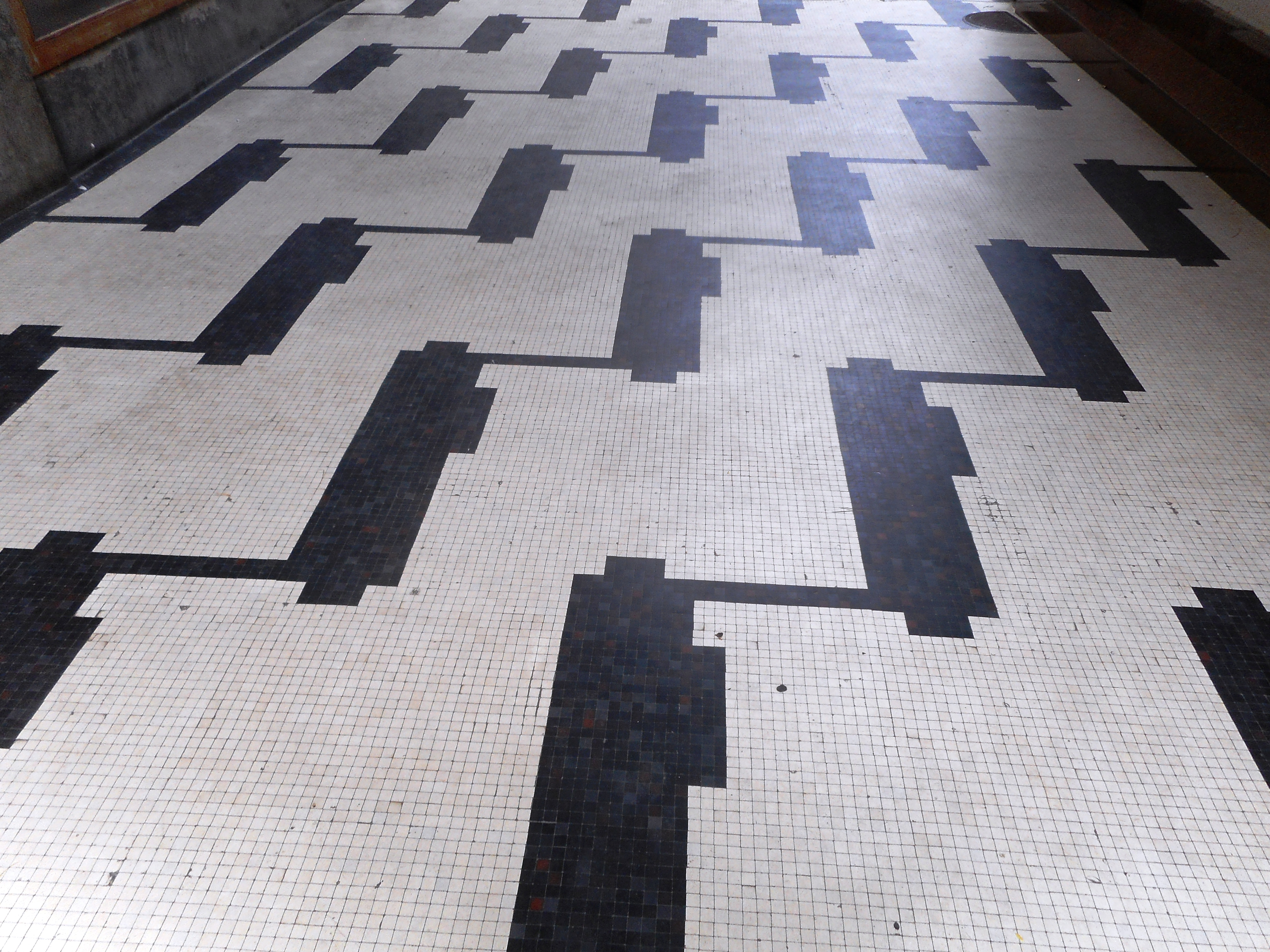
Interlocked fasces in pavement

The Galleria delle Vittorie (Gallery of the Victories) was built as a commercial mall with an entrance on 301 Via Maqueda in central Palermo, region of Sicily, Italy. The five story structure has deteriorated over the decades, though restoration was attempted.

== History ==
The gallery was designed by Paolo Bonci and inaugurated in 1935. The title was meant to honor the Italian victory in their conquest of Ethiopia. The space evokes the glass-roofed commercial malls such as the Galleria Vittorio Emanuele II in Milan. However, this mall, built during the fascist era has a simple and sober facade with the name of the gallery in the Semplicità font used in this era. The entrance had Futurist frescoes, now very degraded, by Alfonso Amorelli celebrating the Italian victories in Ethiopia. The entrance pavement has interlinked black depictions of fasces. The glass roof is lost.

== Note ==
- Derived from Italian Wikipedia entry

== Bibliography ==
- Basile, Gaetano (2007). "Palermo dimentica la Galleria delle Vittorie". In Dario Flaccovio Editore (ed.). Palermo Felicissima... atto secondo. Palermo. pp. 115–117. ISBN 978-88-7758-774-9.
