= Piazza Verdi, Palermo =

Piazza Verdi
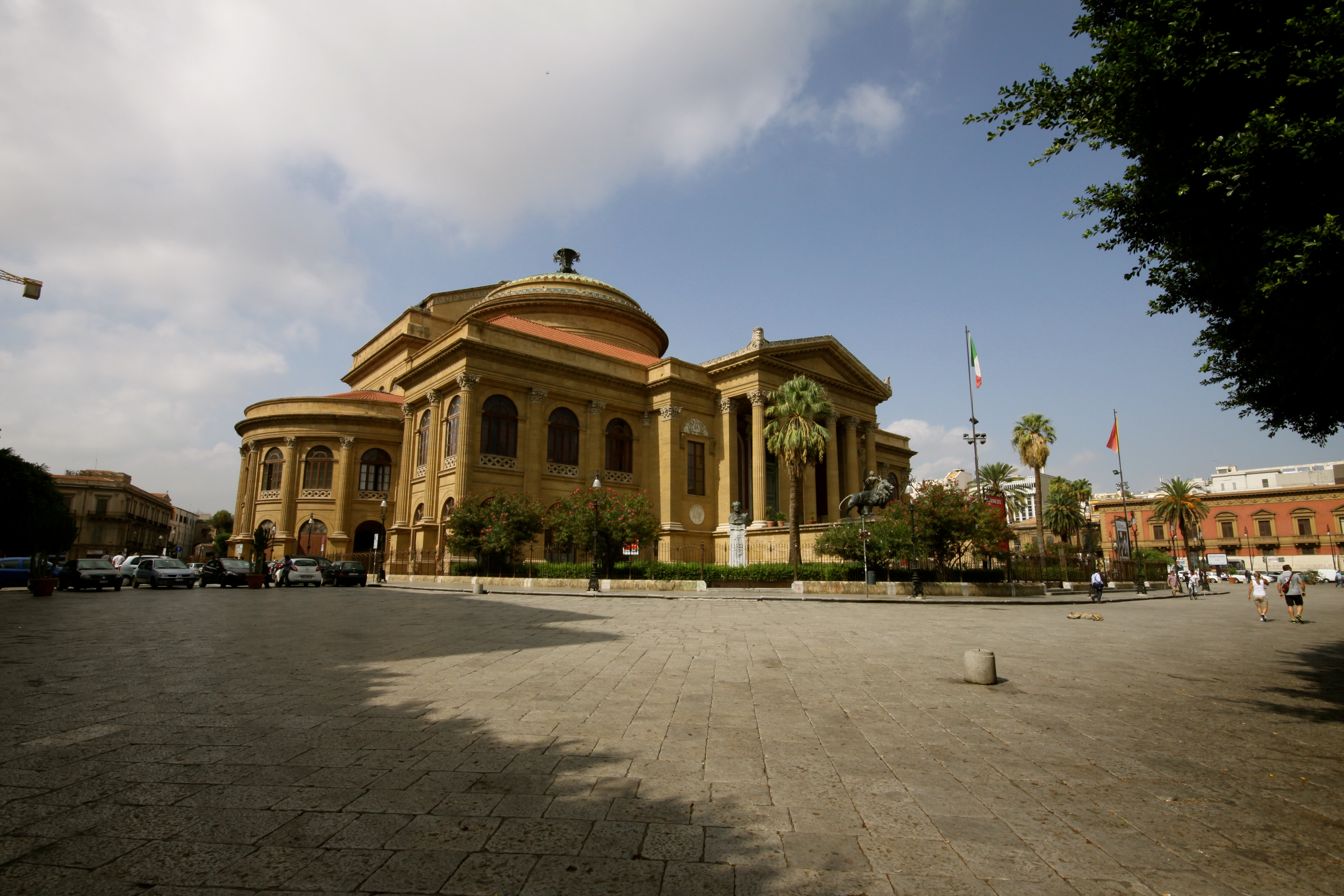
- Piazza Verdi, Teatro Massimo
- Interactive map of Piazza Verdi
- Location: Palermo, Sicily, Italy
- Coordinates: 38°07′12.66″N 13°21′26.33″E

Piazza Verdi, commonly known as Piazza Massimo, is a square of Palermo. At its centre is the sumptuous Teatro Massimo, the biggest opera house of Italy, and the third of Europe after the Opéra National de Paris and the K. K. Hof-Opernhaus in Vienna. The square is located in the heart of the city, near the central Via Maqueda, in the quarter of the Seralcadio, within the historic centre of Palermo.

Piazza Verdi was created in 19th century in order to host the new opera house of Palermo.
