= Palazzo Comitini =

Baroque palace in Palermo, Italy

Comitini Palace
- Palazzo Comitini
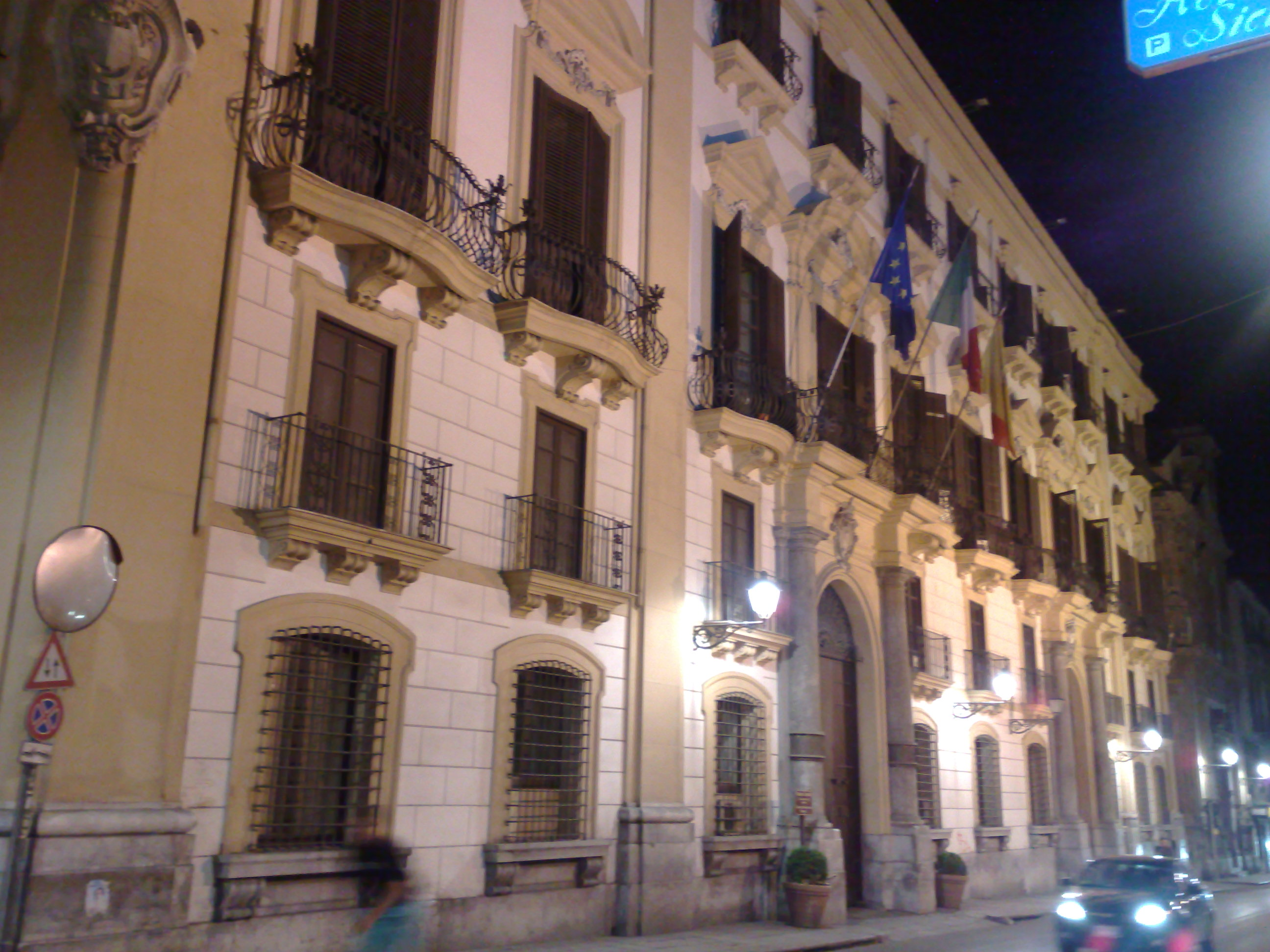
- Façade of the palace. Via Maqueda
- Interactive map of the Comitini Palace area
- Alternative names: Palazzo Gravina di Comitini

General information
- Architectural style: Baroque
- Location: Palermo, Italy, Italy
- Coordinates: 38°06′45.54″N 13°21′47.09″E
- Construction started: 1766
- Completed: 1781

Design and construction
- Architect: Nicolò Palma

Palazzo Comitini, complete name Palazzo Gravina di Comitini, is a Baroque palace located on Via Maqueda #100, adjacent to the church of San'Orsola in the quarter of Albergheria, in the historic center of Palermo, region of Sicily, Italy. Presently, it is the official seat of the Metropolitan City of Palermo (the former Province of Palermo) and the columns flanking the portal read Palazzo della Provincia.

== History ==
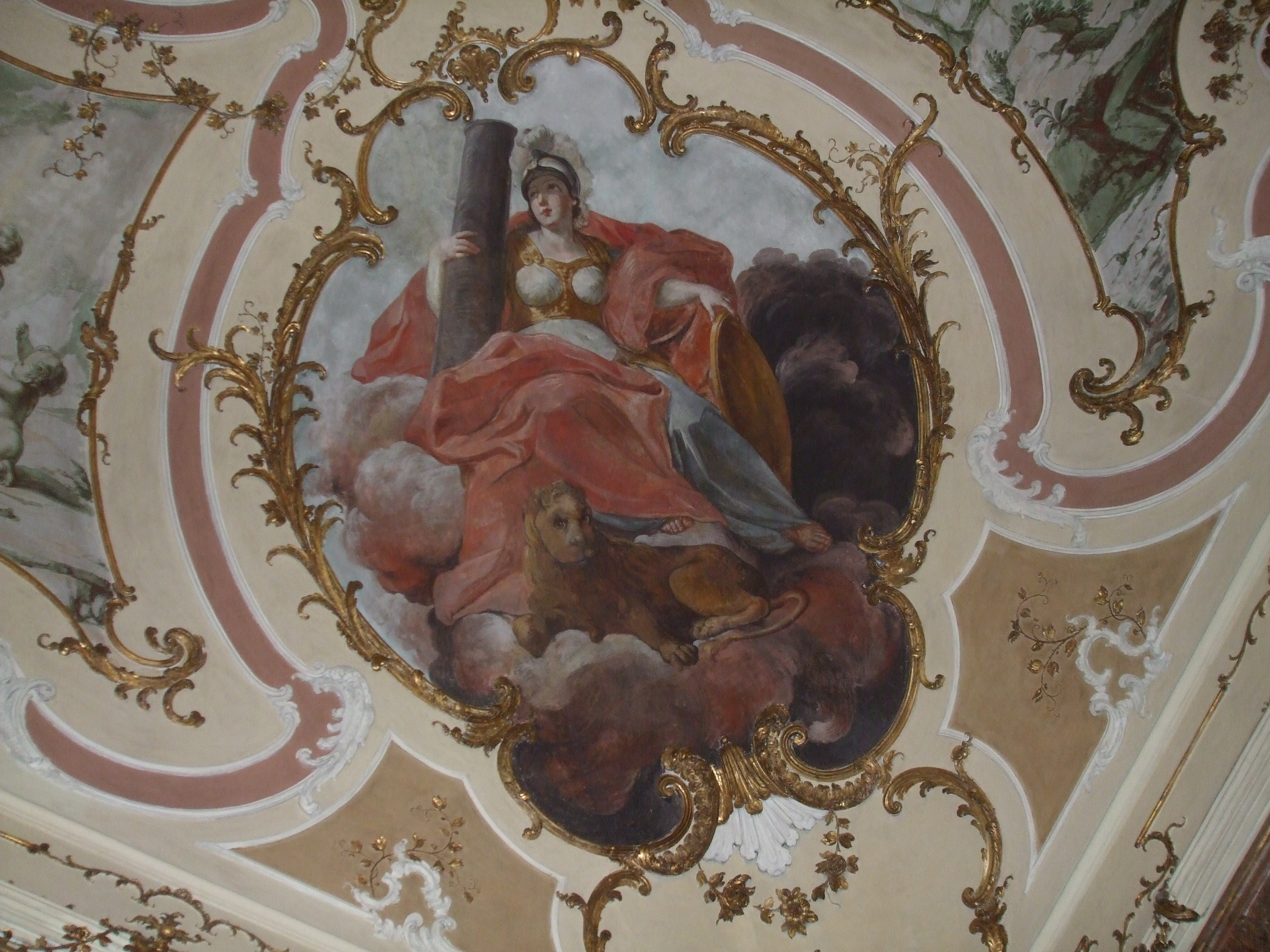
Frescoes from Sala Martorana

The palace was designed by the architect Nicolò Palma, and built between 1766 and 1781, commissioned by Michele Gravina Cruillas, prince of Comitini. The interiors are rich with late-baroque or neoclassical decoration. The main salon, the so-called "Sala Martorana", was frescoed with a Triumph of True Love by Gioacchino Martorana.
