= Quattro Canti =

Square in Palermo, Italy

Coordinates: 38°06′57″N 13°21′41″E

Quattro Canti, officially known as Piazza Vigliena, is a Baroque square in Palermo, region of Sicily, Italy; it is considered the center of the historic quarters of the city. The site is the intersection of two major streets in Palermo, the Via Maqueda and the Corso Vittorio Emanuele (also known as the Cassaro), and at this intersection are the corners of all four of the ancient quarters (Cantons or Canti) of Palermo: the Kalsa (SE); Seralcadi (SW); Albergaria (NW); and Castellammare (NE). On the southwest corner stands the church of San Giuseppe dei Padre Teatini. A few steps away along the flank of this church, behind the Southeast corner building, along Via Maqueda is the Piazza and Fontana Pretoria, sandwiched between this church and Santa Caterina. A few more steps reaches San Cataldo and the ancient Norman church of La Martorana. About 500 meters west along the Cassaro is the piazza of the Cathedral of Palermo and the adjacent Palazzo dei Normanni.

== History ==
This small scale urban plan was laid out on the orders of the Spanish Viceroys between 1608 and 1620 by Giulio Lasso and Mariano Smiriglio.

The piazza layout is octagonal, four sides comprise the streets, while the remaining four sides are nearly symmetric, concave Baroque facades, each with four stories with three full size statues in their centers. The street level up to second story feature four fountains, each dedicated to one the four seasons. The third stories have statues in niches of four Spanish rulers of Sicily; above them in roofline are their respective coat of arms. The fourth and top stories of the buildings have statues of four female patron saints of Palermo: Christina, Ninfa, Olivia and Agata).

The fountains were completed in 1630: Spring and Summer by Gregorio Tedeschi, while Autumn and Winter were sculpted by Nunzio La Mattina. The Spanish kings were sculpted between 1661 and 1663 by Carlo Aprile. At the time the piazza was built, it was an early examples of town planning in Europe.

It is a key location in the Wim Wenders film Palermo Shooting.

Corner location	south-west (SW)	north-west (NW)	north-east (NE)	south-east (SE)
photo				
district	Albergheria	Seralcadio/Capo	La Loggia	Kalsa
season represented by fountain	spring	summer	autumn	winter
king of Spain	Charles V	Philip II	Philip III	Philip IV
patron Saint	Christina of Bolsena	Santa Ninfa	Oliva di Palermo	Sant'Agata

== Gallery ==
Corner location	south-west	north-west	north-east	south-east
Kings of Spain	Charles V	Philip II	Philip III	Philip IV

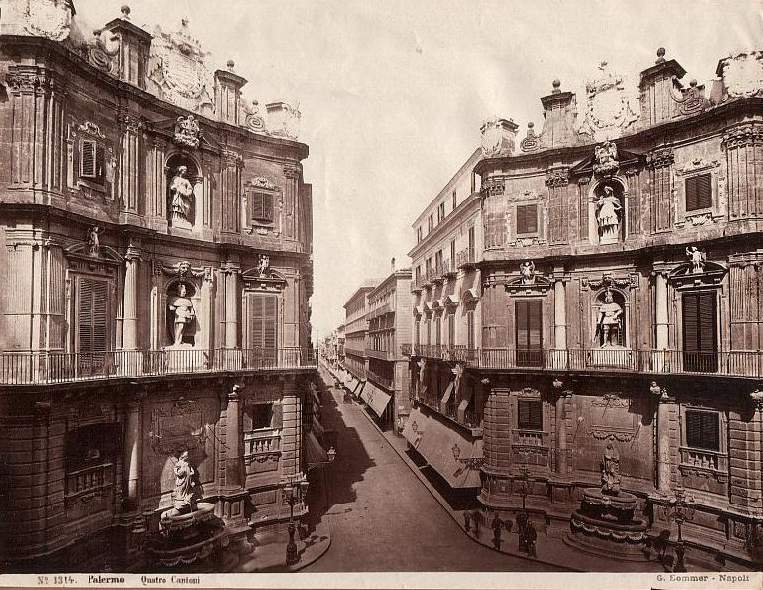

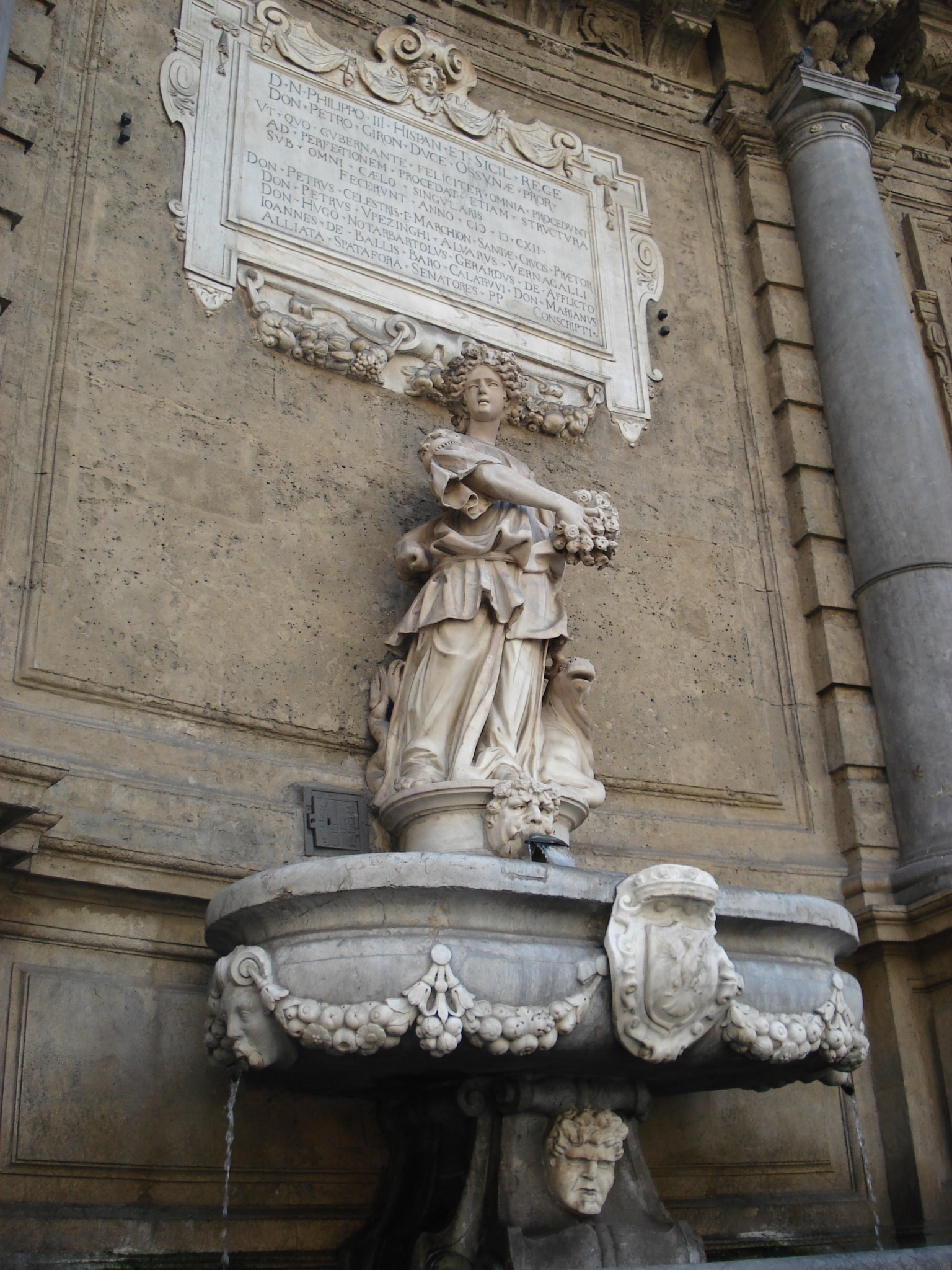

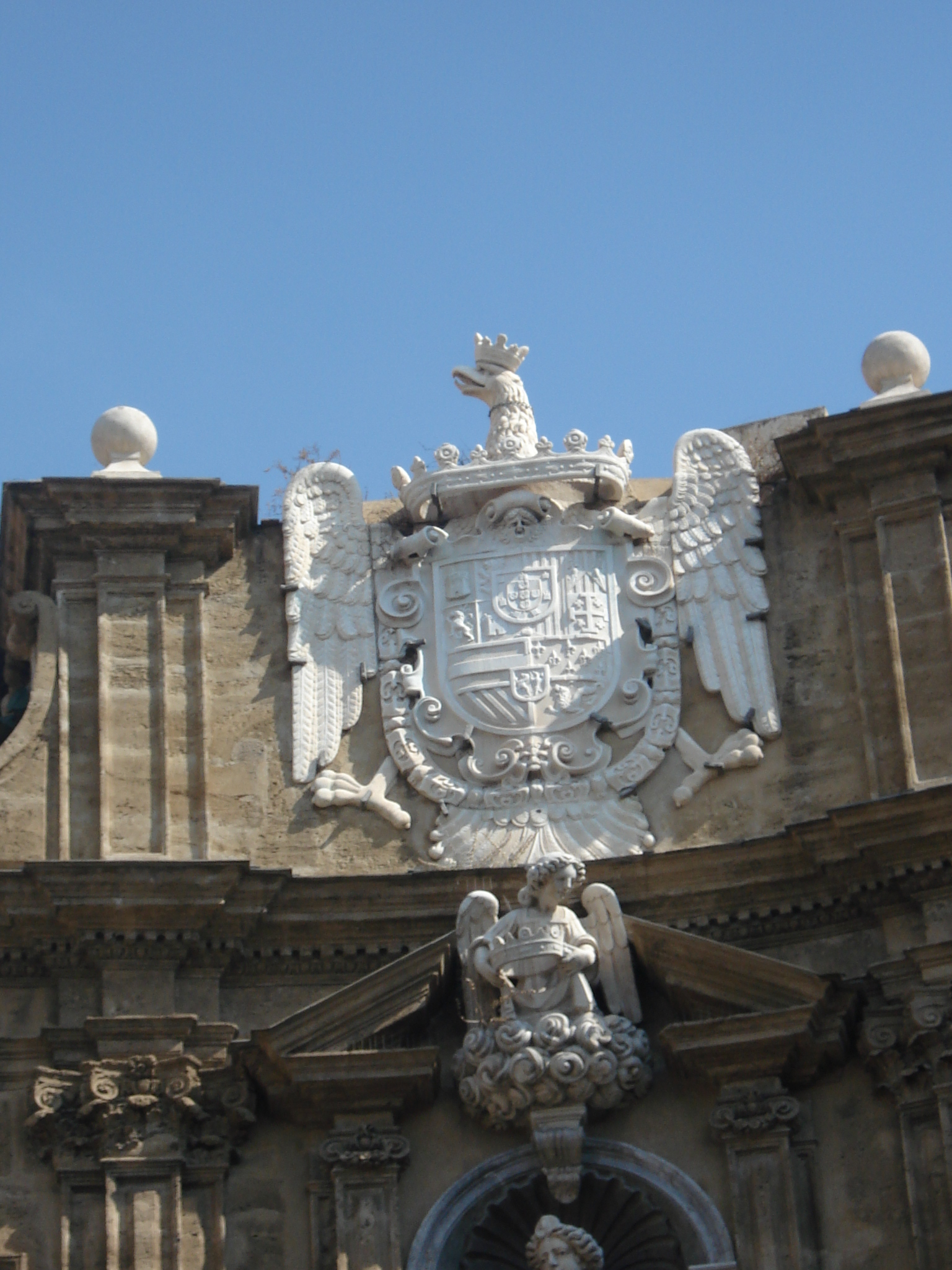

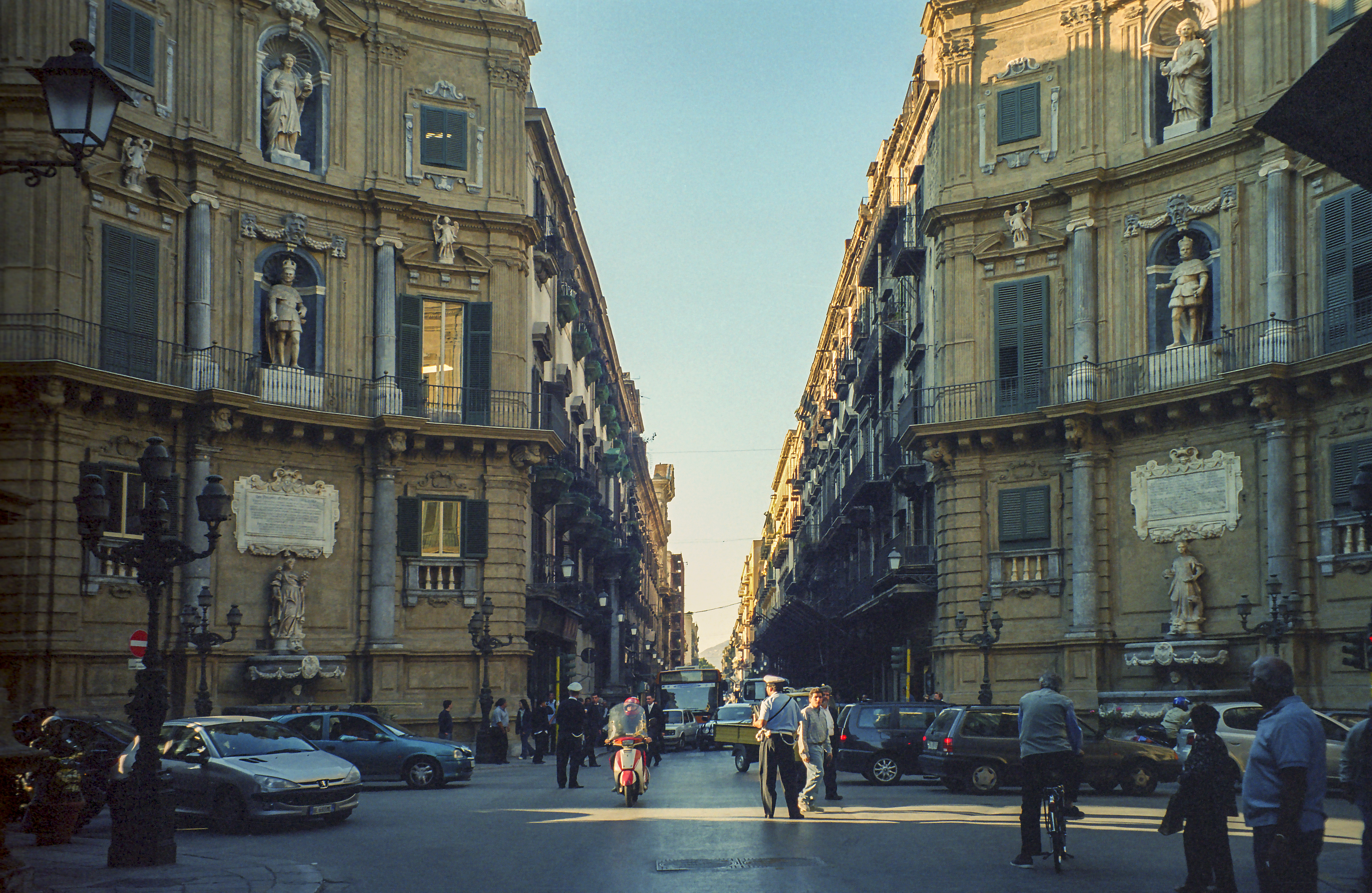
View of North Via Maqueda

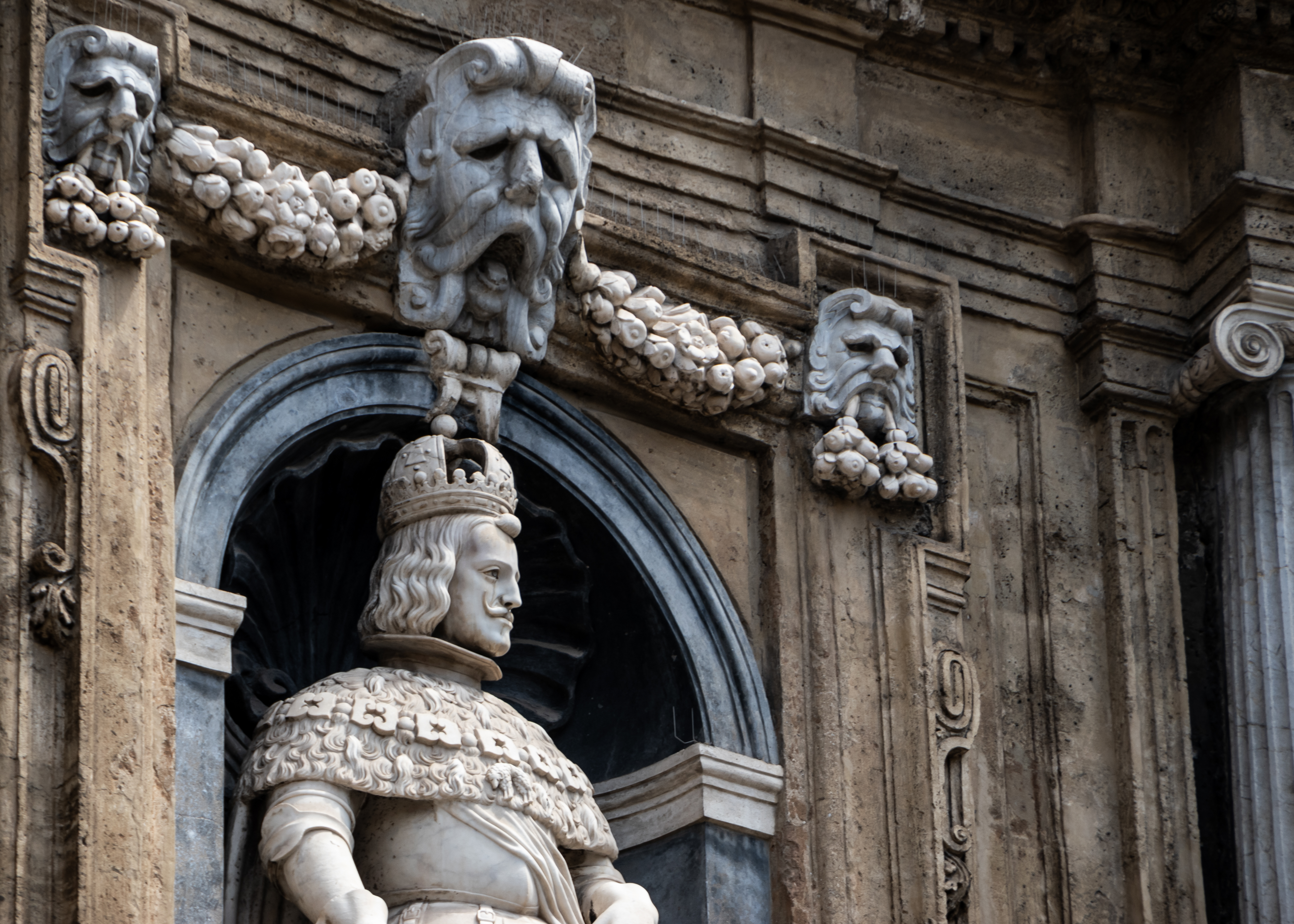
