= Santa Chiara all'Albergaria =

Church building in Palermo, Italy

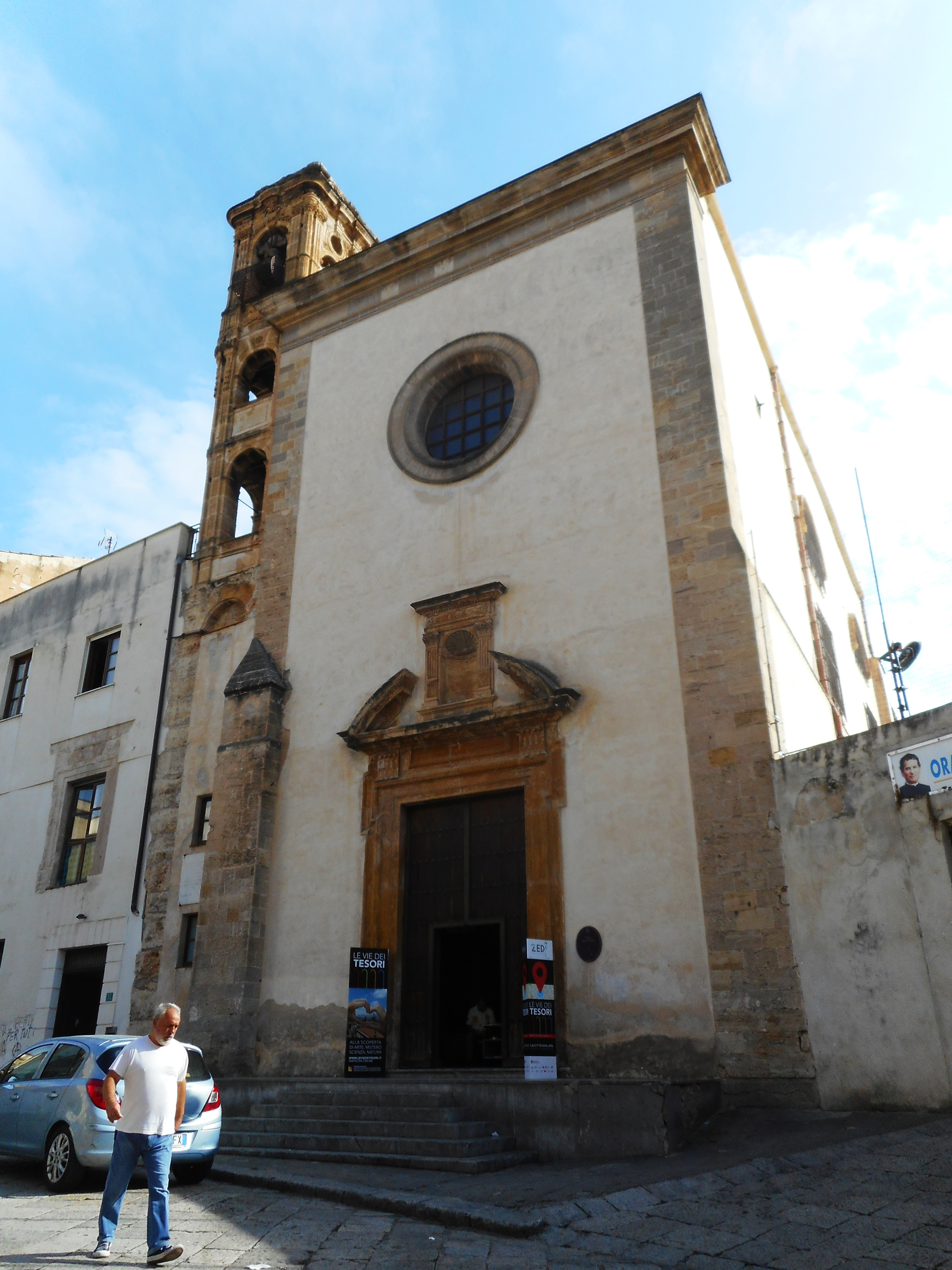
- Façade of the church

Religion
- Affiliation: Roman Catholic
- Province: Archdiocese of Palermo
- Rite: Roman Rite

Location
- Location: Palermo, Italy
- Interactive map of Santa Chiara all'Albergaria
- Coordinates: 38.11307°N 13.35974°E

Santa Chiara all'Albergaria refers to a church and former monastery located in piazza Santa Chiara, in the quarter of Albergaria in the city of Palermo, region of Sicily, Italy. The church is located near the busy outdoor Ballarò marketplace.

== History ==
The monastery was built atop the remains of the ruins of the Carthaginian walls of the ancient town. In 1344, during the Aragonese rule of Sicily, under the patronage of Matteo Sclafani, count of Sclafani and Adernò, a church for Clarissan nuns was built adjacent to their cloistered monastery. The church underwent a major refurbishment in 1678. In 1919, the convent was granted to the Salesian order.

The church was heavily damaged during the Allied bombardment of Palermo in 1943. Prior to the bombardment, the facade was a rich baroque front designed by Paolo Amato and was decorated with Solomonic columns and a statue of St Clare of Assisi. The present facade utilized the portal of the former church of the Madonna delle Grazie dei Macellai once located on Piazzetta dei Caldomai. The flanking baroque bell-tower did survive the bombardment.

== Art and Architecture ==
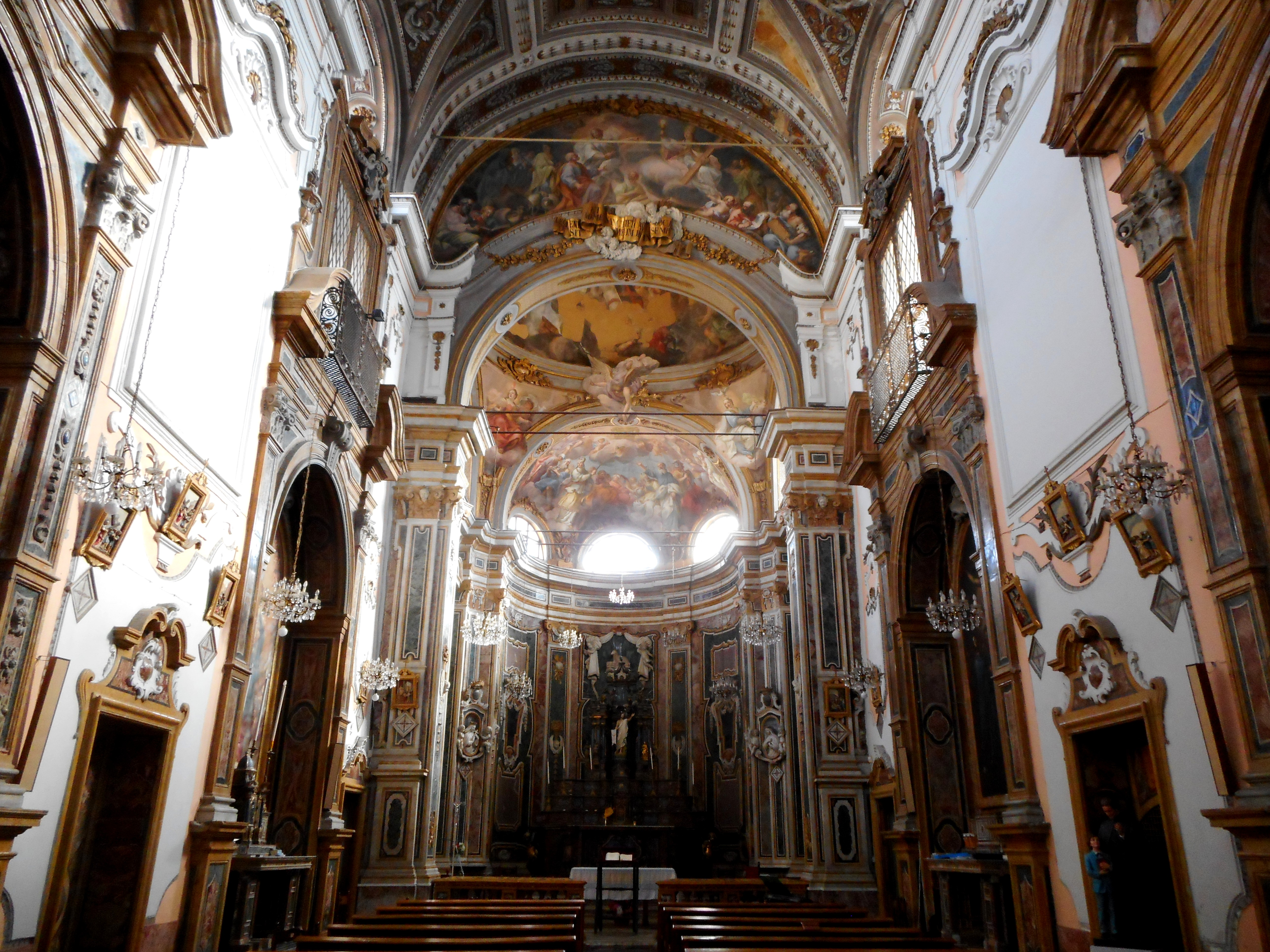
Interior of Church towards apse

The church has a single nave with shallow side chapels and a semicircular apse. The apse dome was designed by Amato in the 1678 reconstruction, which continued even after the 1726 earthquake. The side chapels have lost some of their past decoration, which can still be seen in the apse.

The chapels walls had separate compartments allowing the nuns to attend services while remaining cloistered from the public. The first chapel on the right has an altarpiece depicting St Clare (1713) by Olivio Sozzi. It was donated by the nuns from the monastery of Valverde in the 1719. The second chapel on the right, dedicated to the Crucifix, has an Crucifixion with Mary, St John, and Mary Magdalen (1748) painted by Gaspare Serenari.

A Pietà painted by Pietro Novelli, was once present here, but now is on display in the Museo Diocesano of Palermo. The allegorical frescoes in the apse are attributed to Paolo Martorana, depict Christ granting the keys to St Peter. In the half-dome of the apse, Gaspare Fumagalli painted a Triumph of the Ark of Alliance (circa 1749). Antonio Grano painted the Triumph of the Cross (1678) for the cupola ceiling. The spandrels are painted with female allegories of the four cardinal virtues of knowledge, fortitude, justice, and charity.

The main altar is made with precious stones (lapis-lazuli, agate, and amethyst and colored marbles) and gilded bronze. The walls host four paintings (1735) depicting events in the life of Saints Francis and St Claire by Guglielmo Borremans. Various busts of female saints overlook the altar including Saints Rosalia, Restituta, Margaret of Scotland and St Elizabeth of Portugal.
