= Gaspare Serenario =

Italian painter

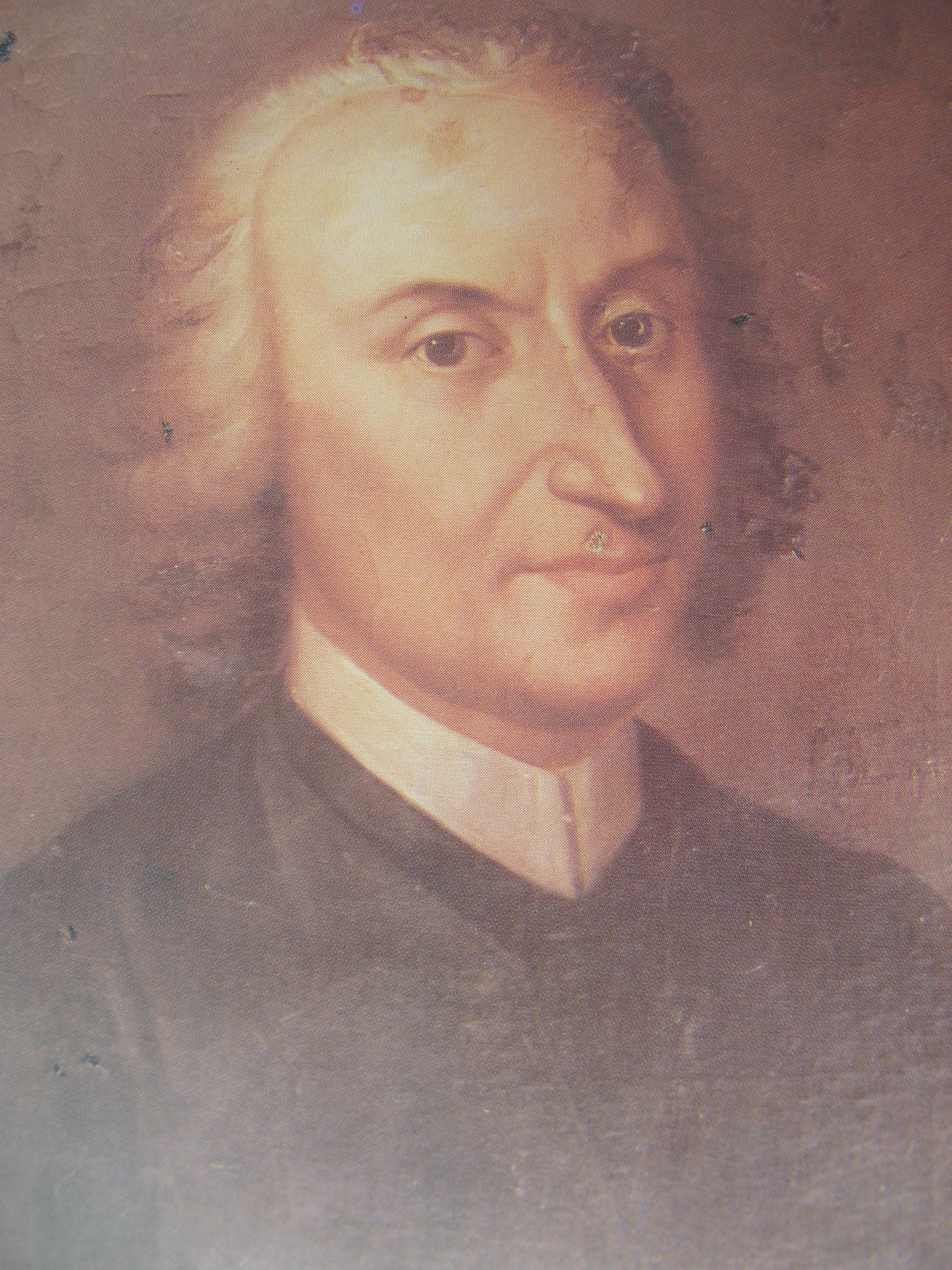
aspare Serenario

Gaspare Serenario (Palermo, Sicily 1707–1759) was an Italian painter, active mainly in a grand late Baroque style.

== Biography ==
As a youth, he moved to Rome, where he lived for over thirty years. Along with the fellow Sicilian Olivio Sozzi, Serenario trained under Sebastiano Conca, then the pre-eminent studio in Rome. Serenario was named knight of the Order of the Congregazione Pontificia dei Virtuosi al Pantheon. He returns to Palermo where he completes the cycle of decorations for the church of Santa Rosalia and completes frescos for Palazzo Mazzarino. He was nominated director of the mosaics of the Cappella Palatina.

He painted an altarpiece depicting the Crucifixion with Mary, St John, and Mary Magdalen (1748) for a chapel of the church of Santa Chiara all'Albergaria.
