= Monte di Pietà, Palermo =

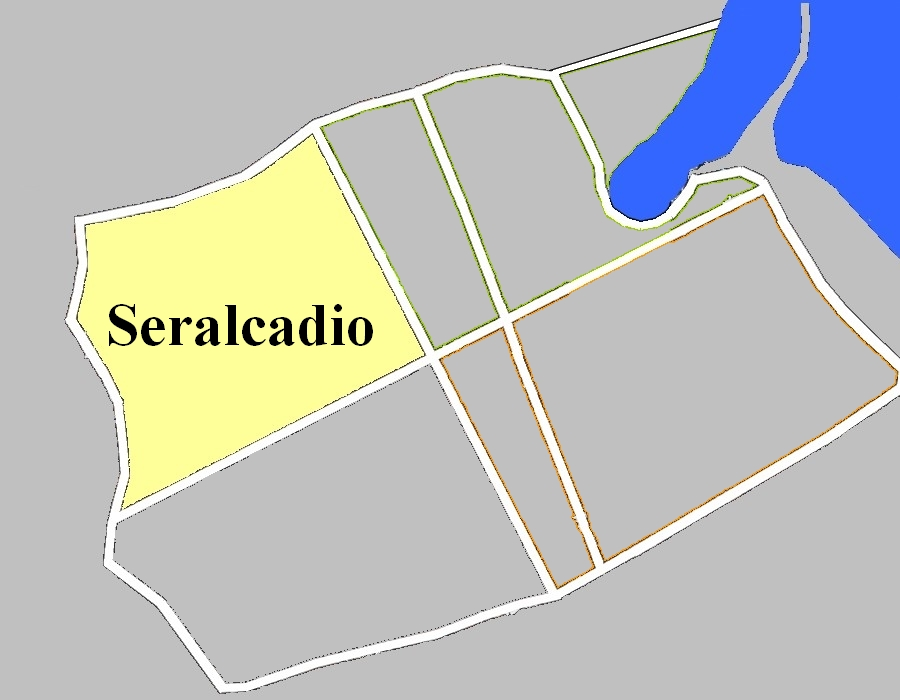

Monte di Pietà, also called Seralcadi, Seralcadio, or il Capo, is one of the original quarters of Palermo, region of Sicily, Italy.

The four original districts (Italian: mandamenti) were established during the Spanish rule of Palermo. Seralcadi derived from the arabic name Sari al Cadì encompasses the Palermo Cathedral and the mercato il Capo. The quarter has as a patron Santa Ninfa and its coat of arms depicts Hercules slaying the lion.
