= Churches in Palermo =

Palermo, the main city of Sicily, has a many historic churches ranging from the Arab-Norman-Byzantine style via Gothic to Baroque instyle. The list includes the most important churches of the historic centre divided into four areas of Kalsa, Albergaria, Seralcadi and Loggia.

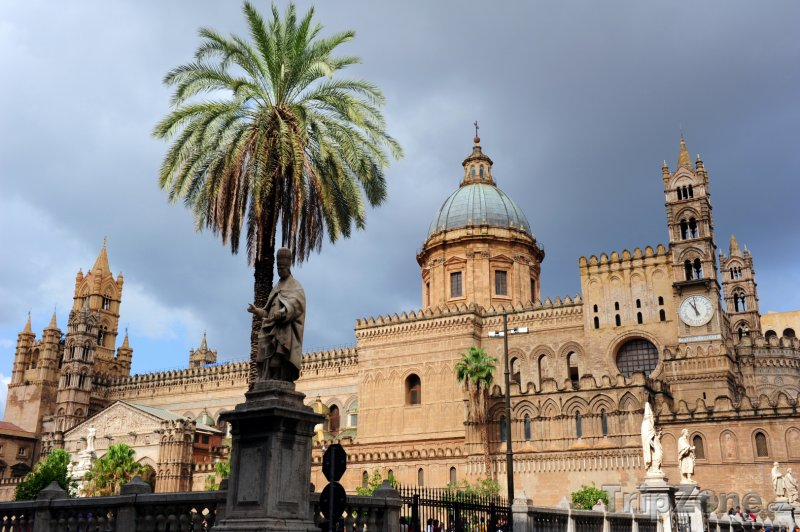
Palermo Cathedral

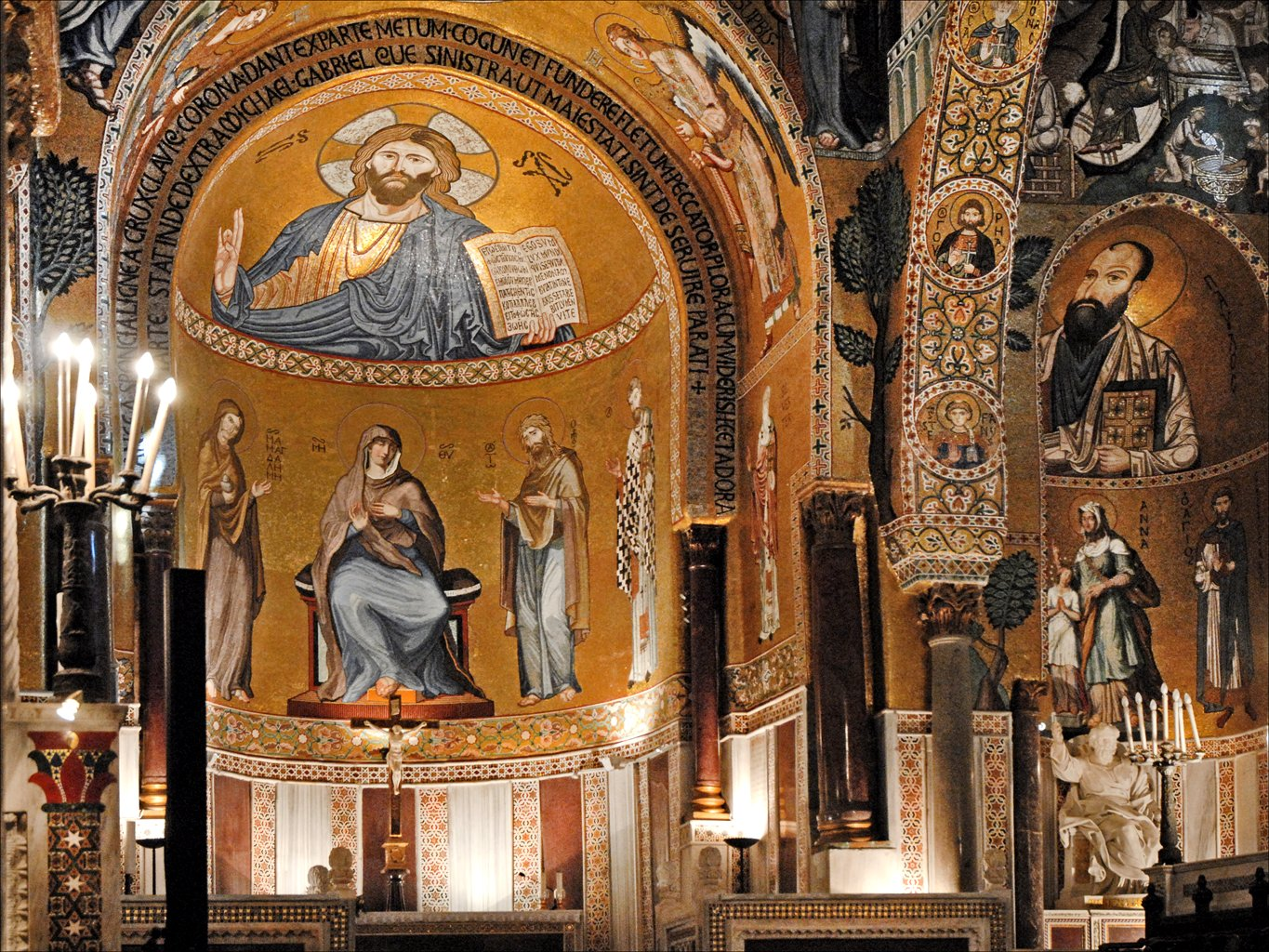
Cappella Palatina

== Historic centre ==
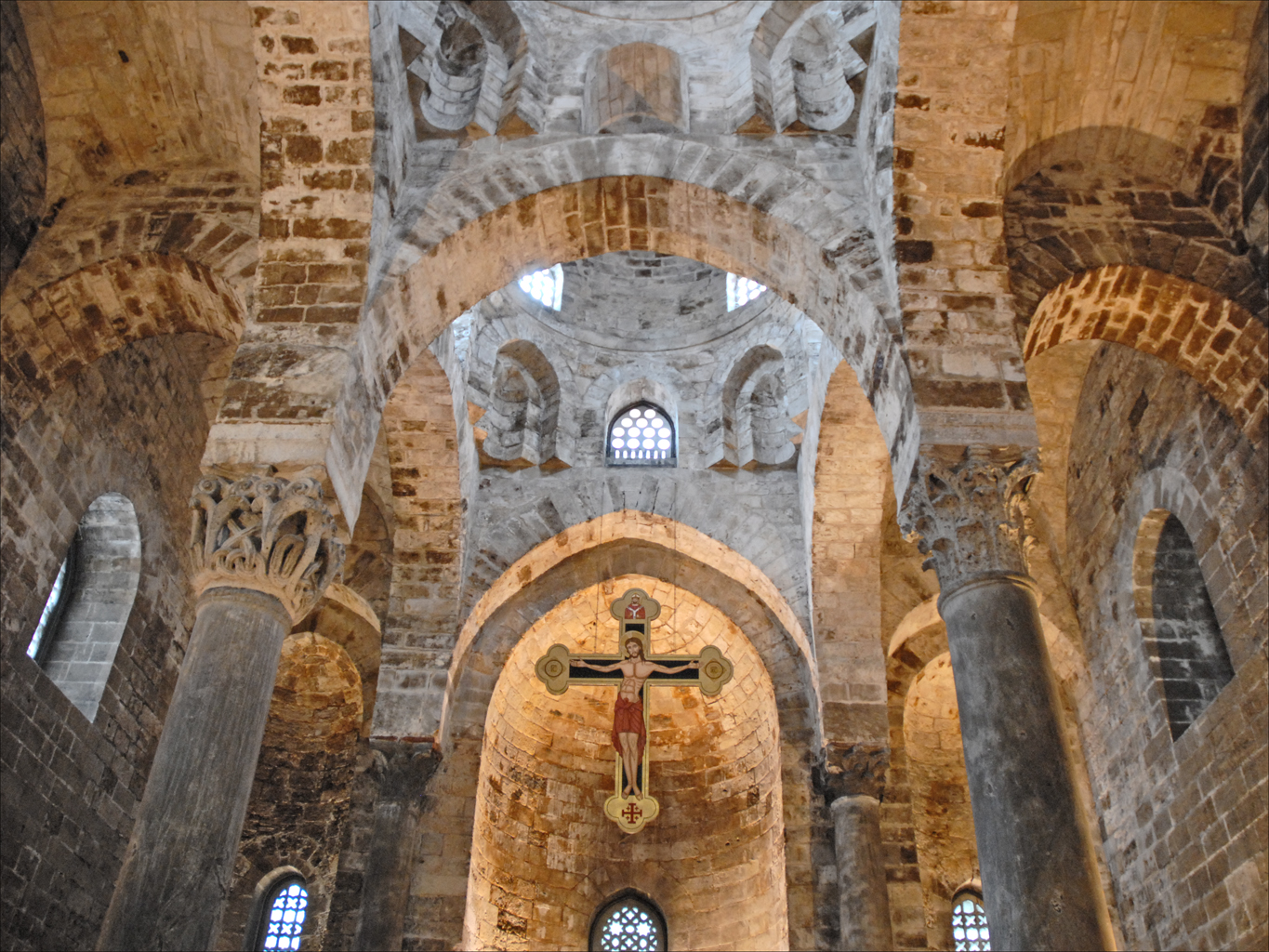
San Cataldo

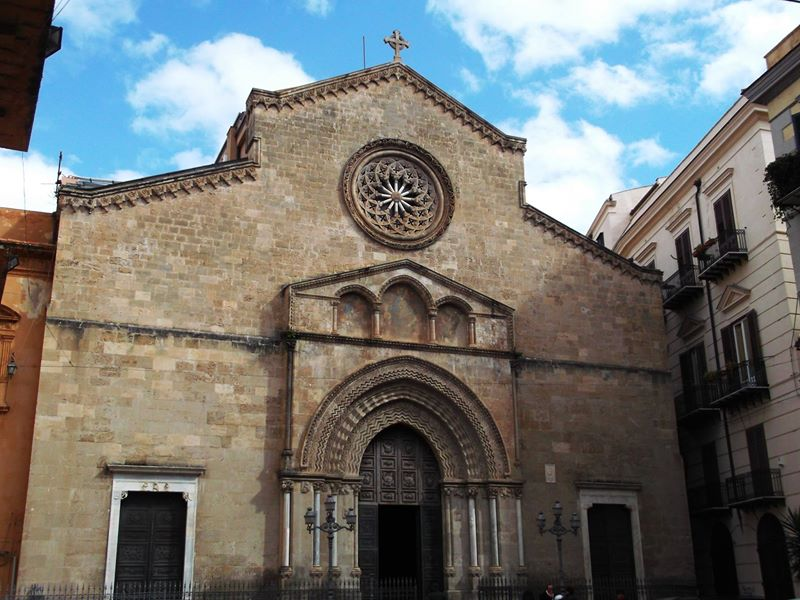
San Francesco d'Assisi

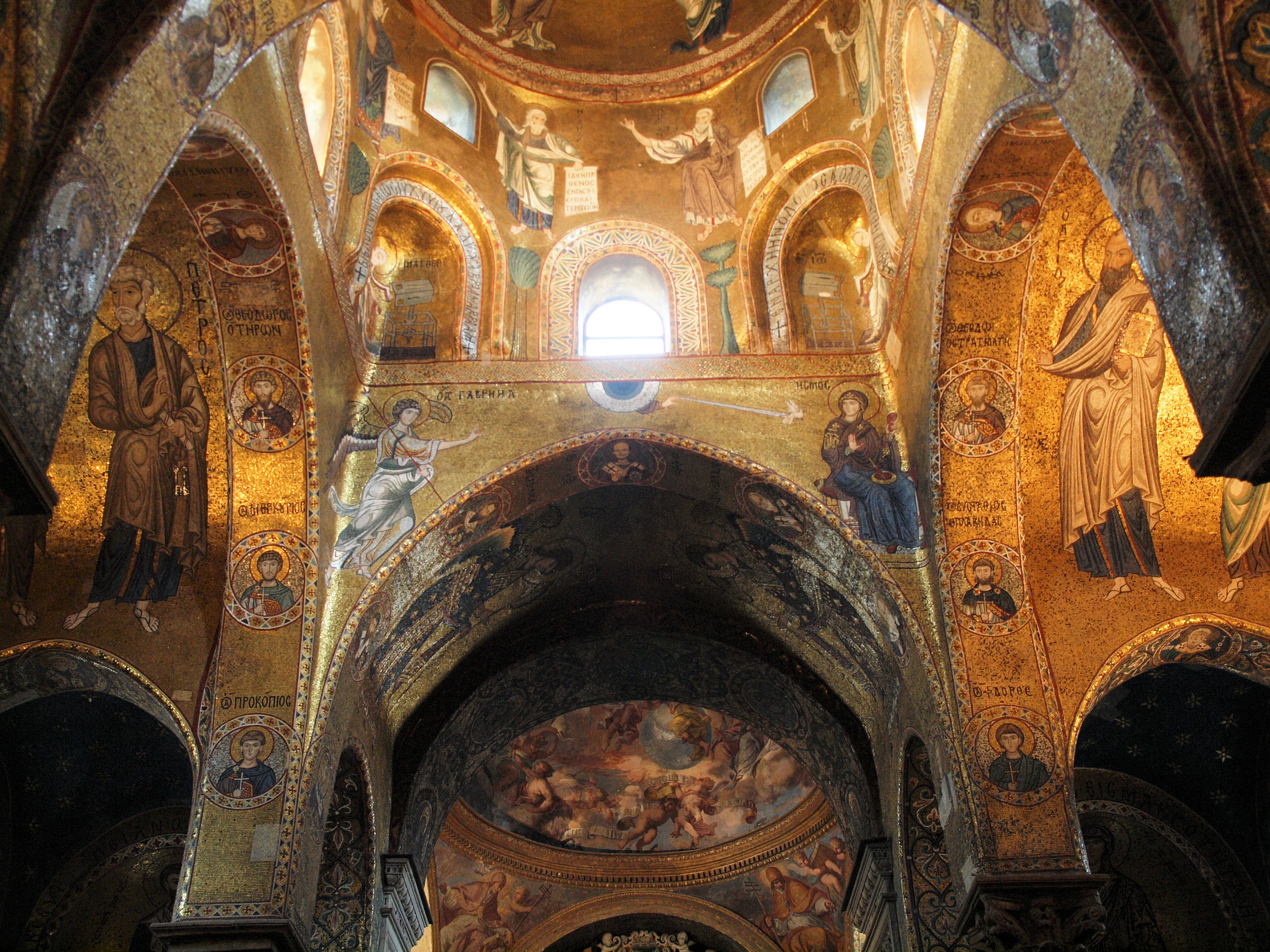
La Martorana

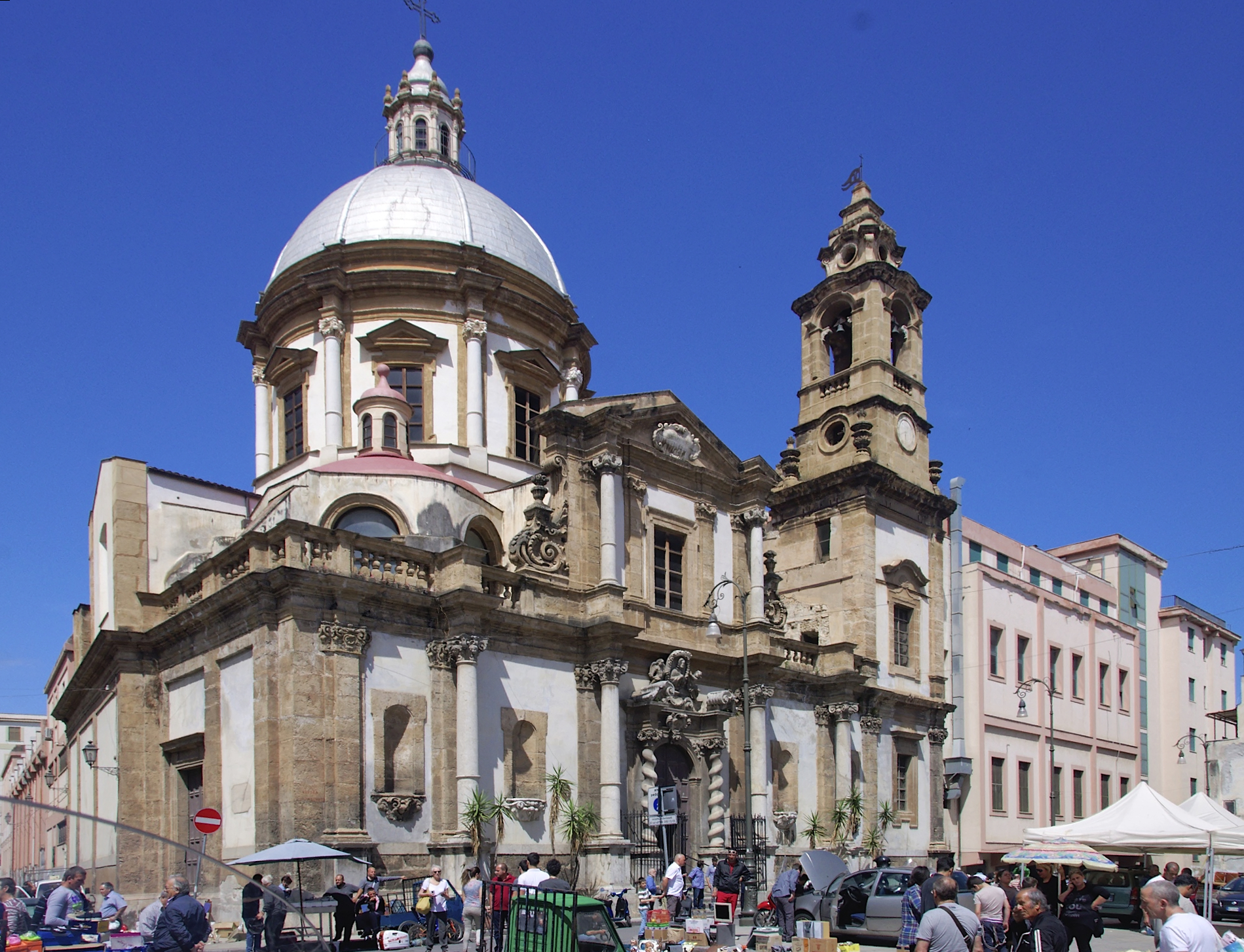
San Francesco Saverio

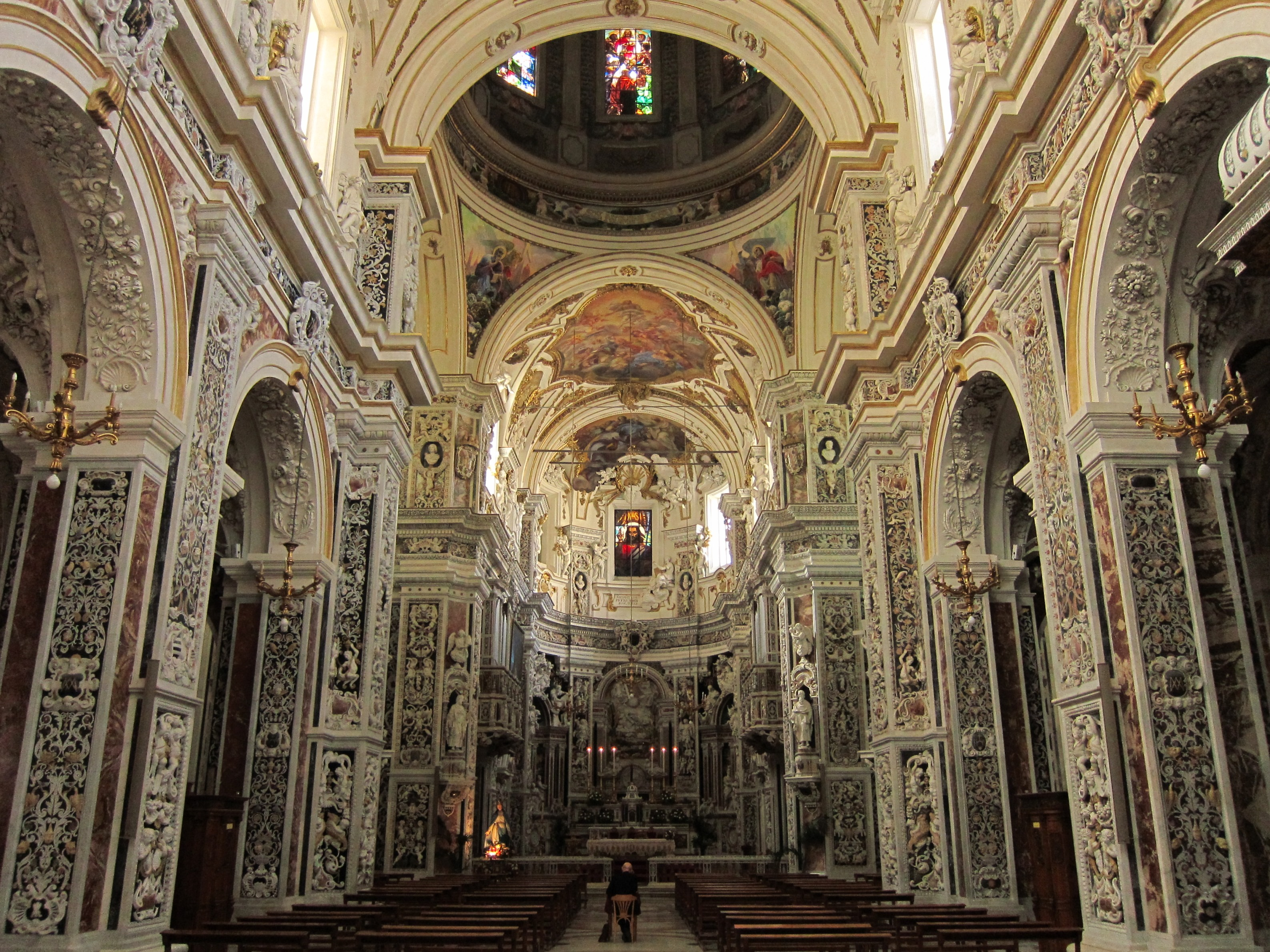
Casa Professa

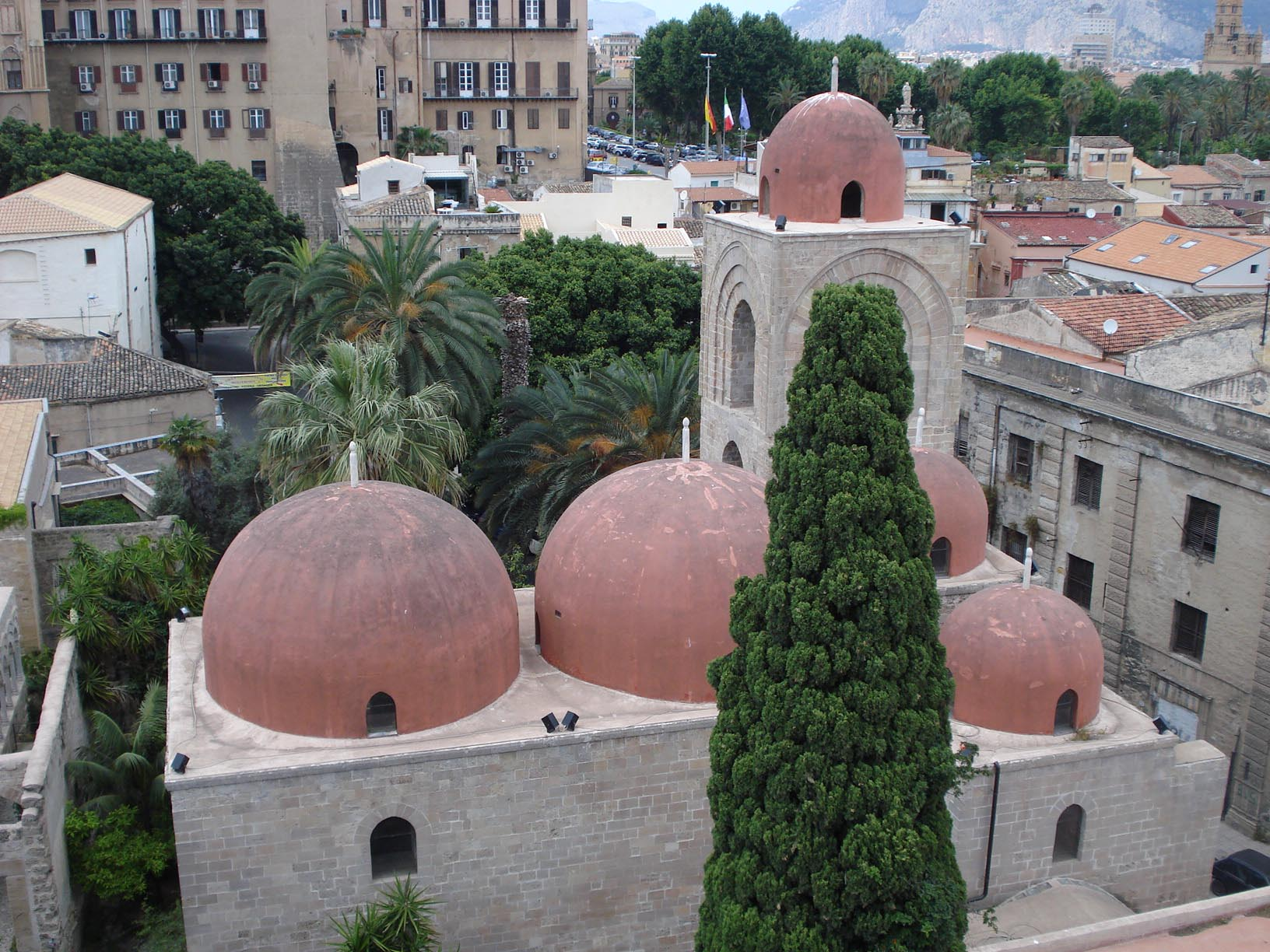
San Giovanni degli Eremiti

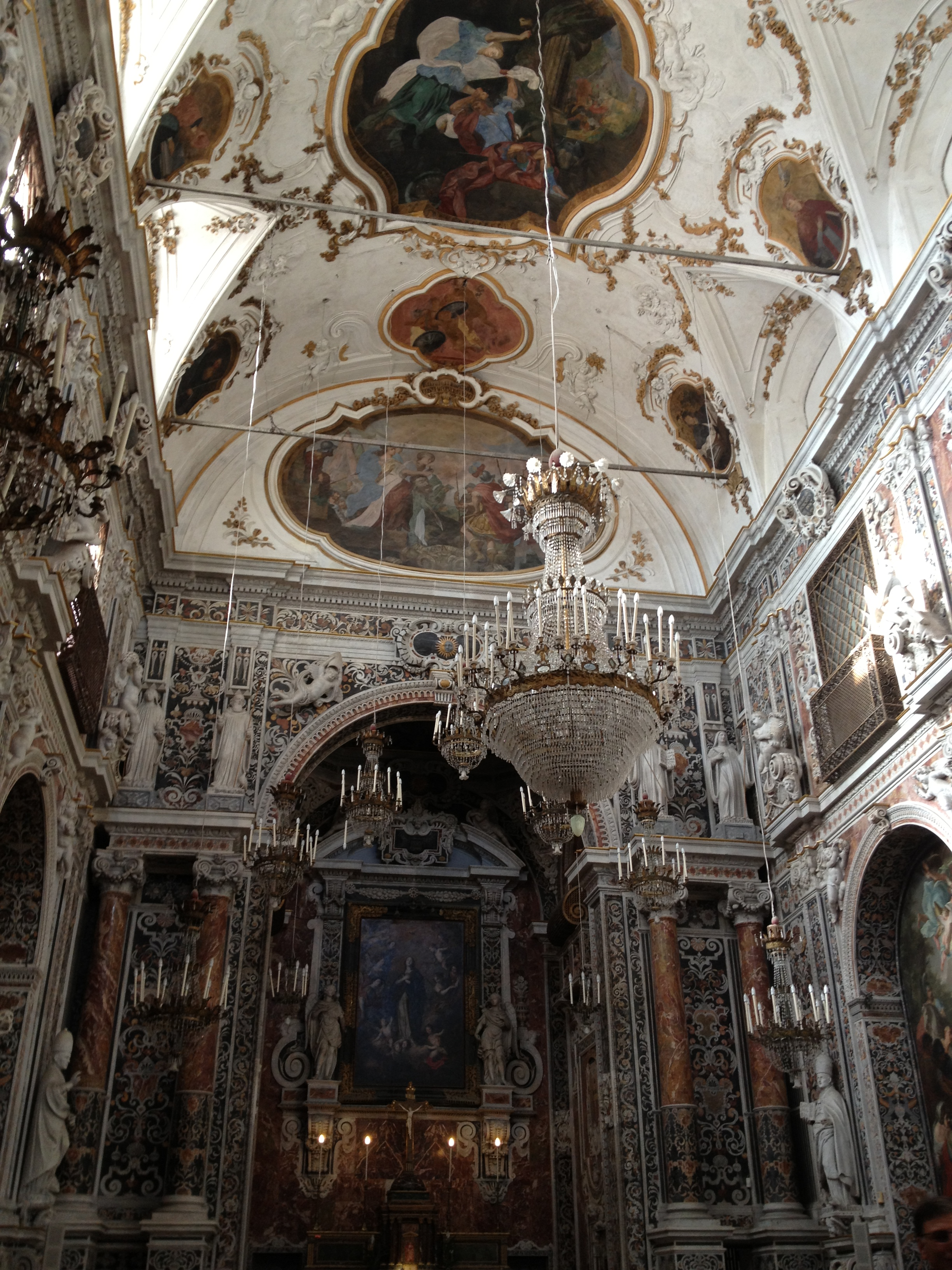
Immacolata Concezione al Capo

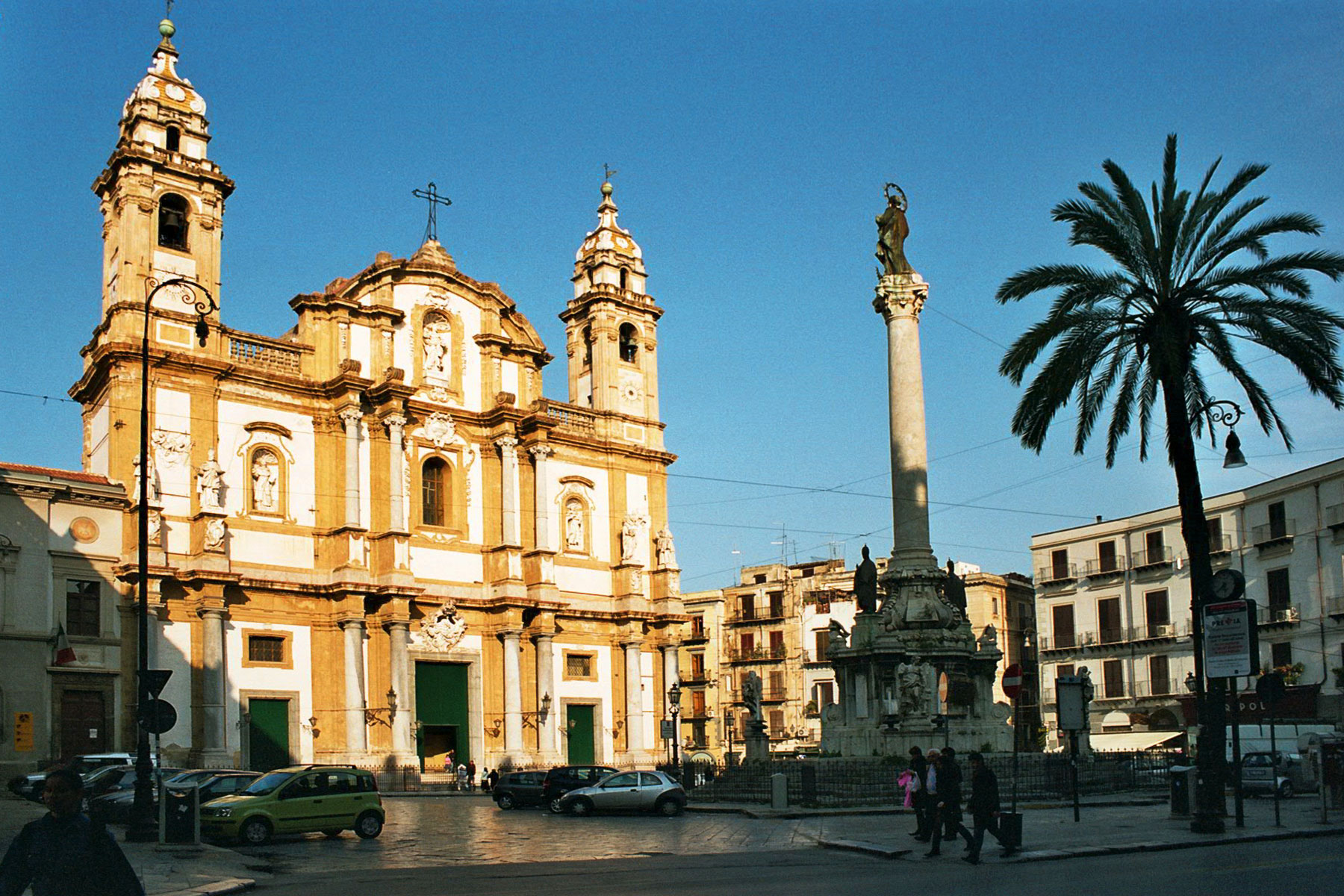
San Domenico

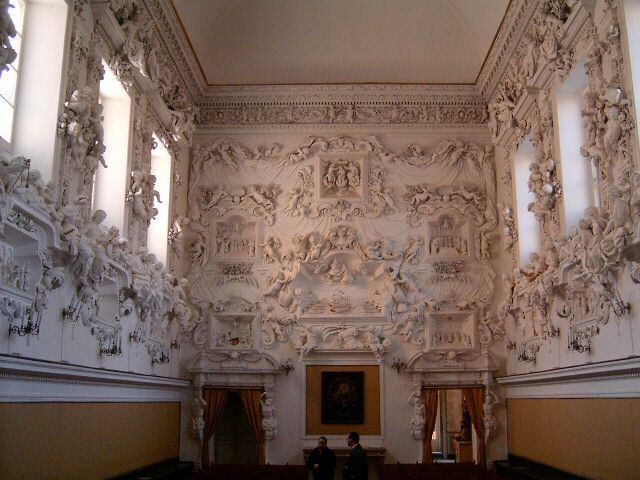
Oratorio del Rosario di Santa Cita

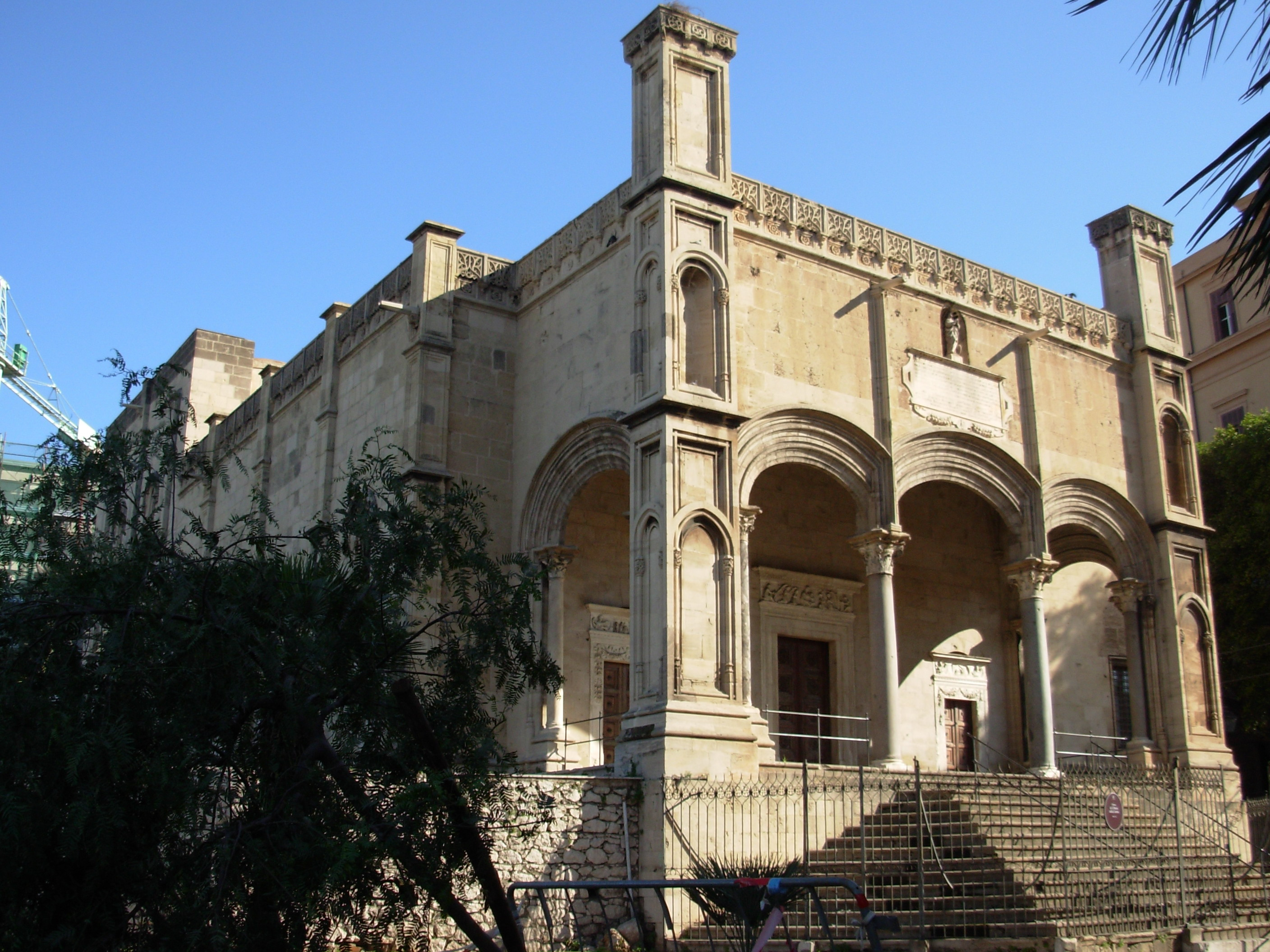
Santa Maria della Catena

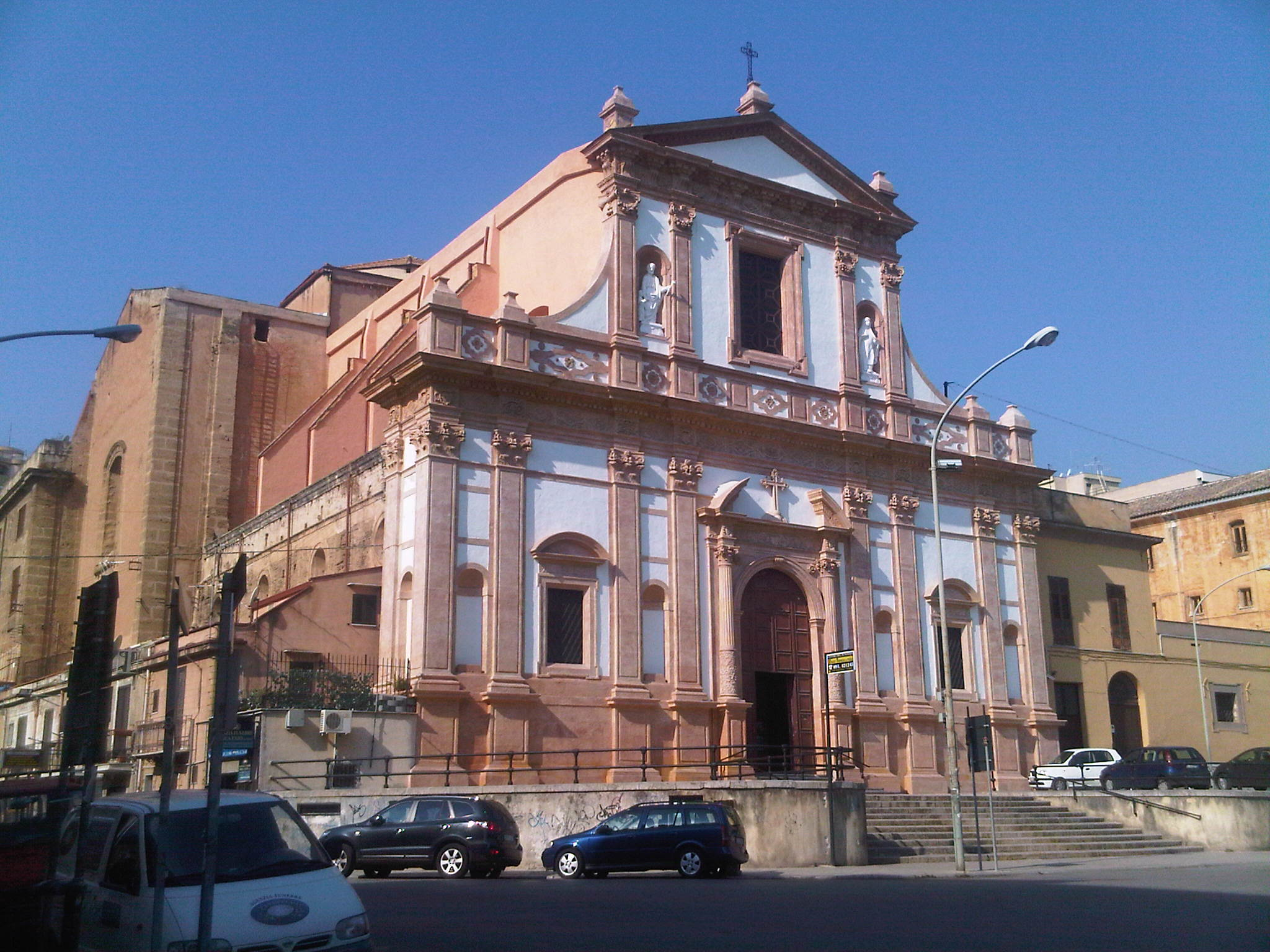
Madonna dei Rimedi

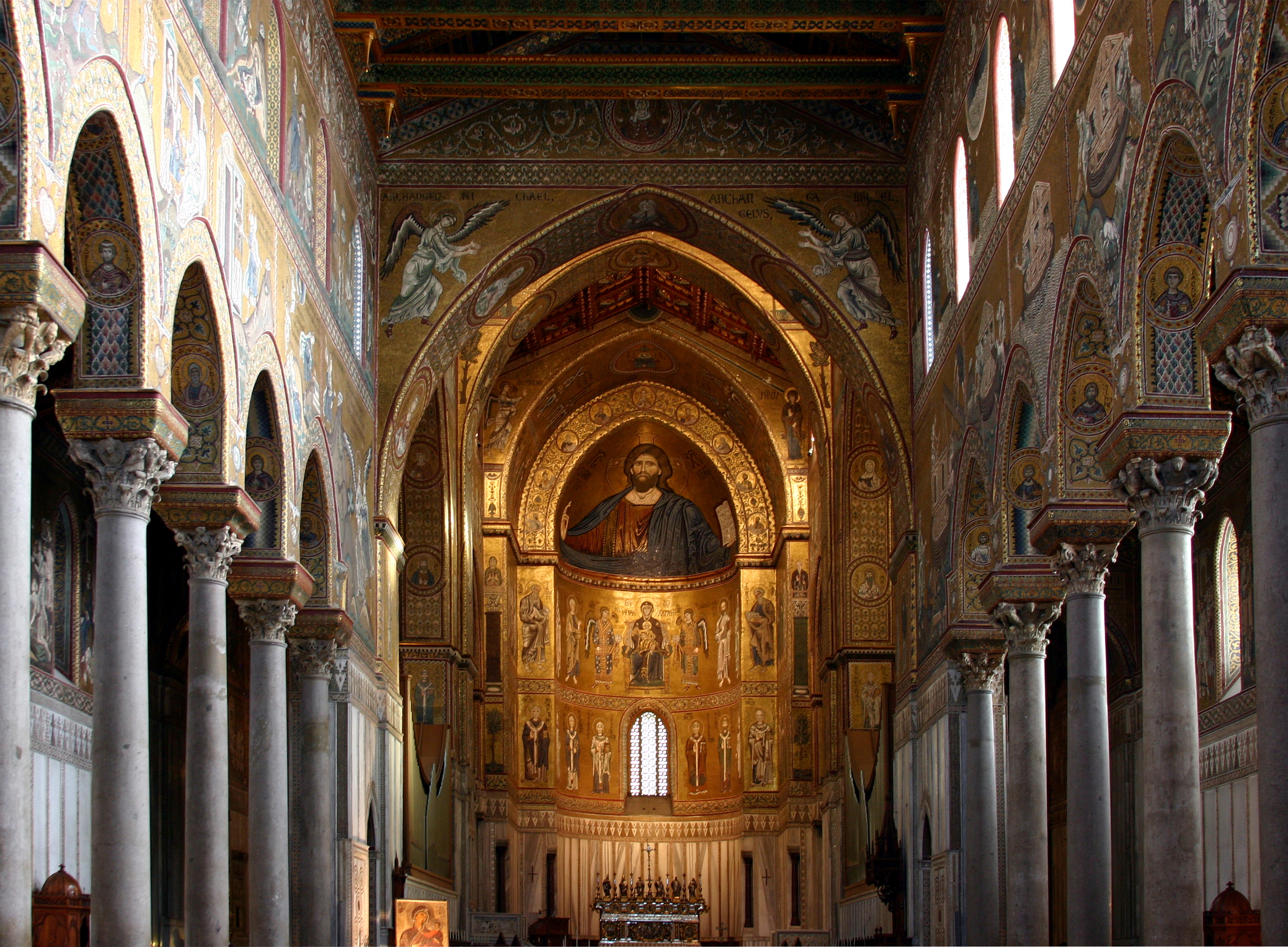
Monreale Cathedral

=== Kalsa (or Tribunali) ===
Churches:

- Sant'Anna la Misericordia
- Chiesa dell'Assunta
- San Carlo dei Milanesi
- San Cataldo
- Santa Caterina
- San Francesco d'Assisi
- San Giovanni dei Napoletani
- La Magione
- La Martorana
- Santa Maria degli Agonizzanti
- Santa Maria della Gancia
- Santa Maria dell'Itria alla Kalsa
- Santa Maria dei Miracoli
- Santa Maria della Pietà
- Santa Maria di Porto Salvo
- Santa Maria dello Spasimo
- San Mattia ai Crociferi
- San Nicola da Tolentino
- Santissima Pietà
- Santa Teresa alla Kalsa

Oratories:

- Oratorio dei Bianchi
- Oratorio dell'Immacolatella
- Oratorio di San Lorenzo

=== Albergaria (or Palazzo Reale) ===
Churches:

- Cappella Palatina
- Carmine Maggiore
- Casa Professa
- Santa Chiara all'Albergaria
- Sant'Elena e Costantino
- San Francesco Saverio
- San Giorgio in Kemonia
- San Giovanni degli Eremiti
- San Giovanni dell'Origlione
- San Giuseppe dei Teatini
- Maria Santissima della Soledad
- Sant'Orsola
- La Pinta
- Santi Quaranta Martiri Pisani al Casalotto
- Santissimo Salvatore

Oratories:

- Oratorio del Carminello
- Oratorio delle Dame
- Oratorio di San Giuseppe dei Falegnami
- Oratorio di San Mercurio

=== Monte di Pietà or Seralcadi ===
Churches:

- Palermo Cathedral
- Cappella dell'Incoronata
- Chiesa dell'Angelo Custode
- Sant'Agata alla Guilla
- Sant'Agostino
- Santi Cosma e Damiano
- Santa Cristina la Vetere
- Santi Diecimila Martiri
- Sacra Famiglia al Papireto
- San Giovanni alla Guilla
- San Gregorio Papa
- Immacolata Concezione al Capo
- Madonna delle Grazie dei Macellai
- Madonna di Monte Oliveto or Badia Nuova
- Santa Maria di Gesù al Capo
- Santa Maria della Mercede
- Santa Maria Maddalena
- Santa Ninfa dei Crociferi
- San Ranieri
- San Rocco
- Santa Rosalia ai Quattro Coronati
- San Stanislao Koskta
- Chiesa dei Tre Re

Oratories:

- Oratorio dei Santi Pietro e Paolo
- Oratorio di Santo Stefano protomartire

=== Castellamare or Loggia ===
Churches:

- Sant'Alessandro dei Carbonai
- Sant'Andrea degli Amalfitani
- Sant'Andrea
- Sant'Antonio Abate
- Santa Cita or San Mamiliano
- San Domenico
- Sant'Eulalia dei Catalani
- San Gioacchino
- San Giorgio dei Genovesi
- Sant'Ignazio all'Olivella
- Madonna del Lume
- Madonna del Soccorso
- Santa Maria della Catena
- Santa Maria di Valverde
- Santa Maria la Nova
- San Matteo al Cassaro
- San Sebastiano a Porta Carbone
- Santa Sofia dei Tavernieri

Oratories:

- Oratorio di Santa Caterina d'Alessandria
- Oratorio del Rosario di Santa Cita
- Oratorio del Rosario di San Domenico

== Others ==
- San Ciro a Maredolce
- Ecce Homo all'Uditore
- San Francesco di Paola
- San Giovanni dei Lebbrosi
- Santa Lucia al Monte
- Madonna dei Rimedi
- Santa Maria di Monserrato
- Santa Maria della Pace
- Santo Spirito
- Santo Stefano Protomartire alla Zisa
- Cappella della Santissima Trinità alla Zisa
- Santuario di Santa Rosalia
- Monreale Cathedral

== Non-Catholic churches ==
- Anglican Church
- Waldensian Church
