= Mariano Smiriglio =

Sicilian architect

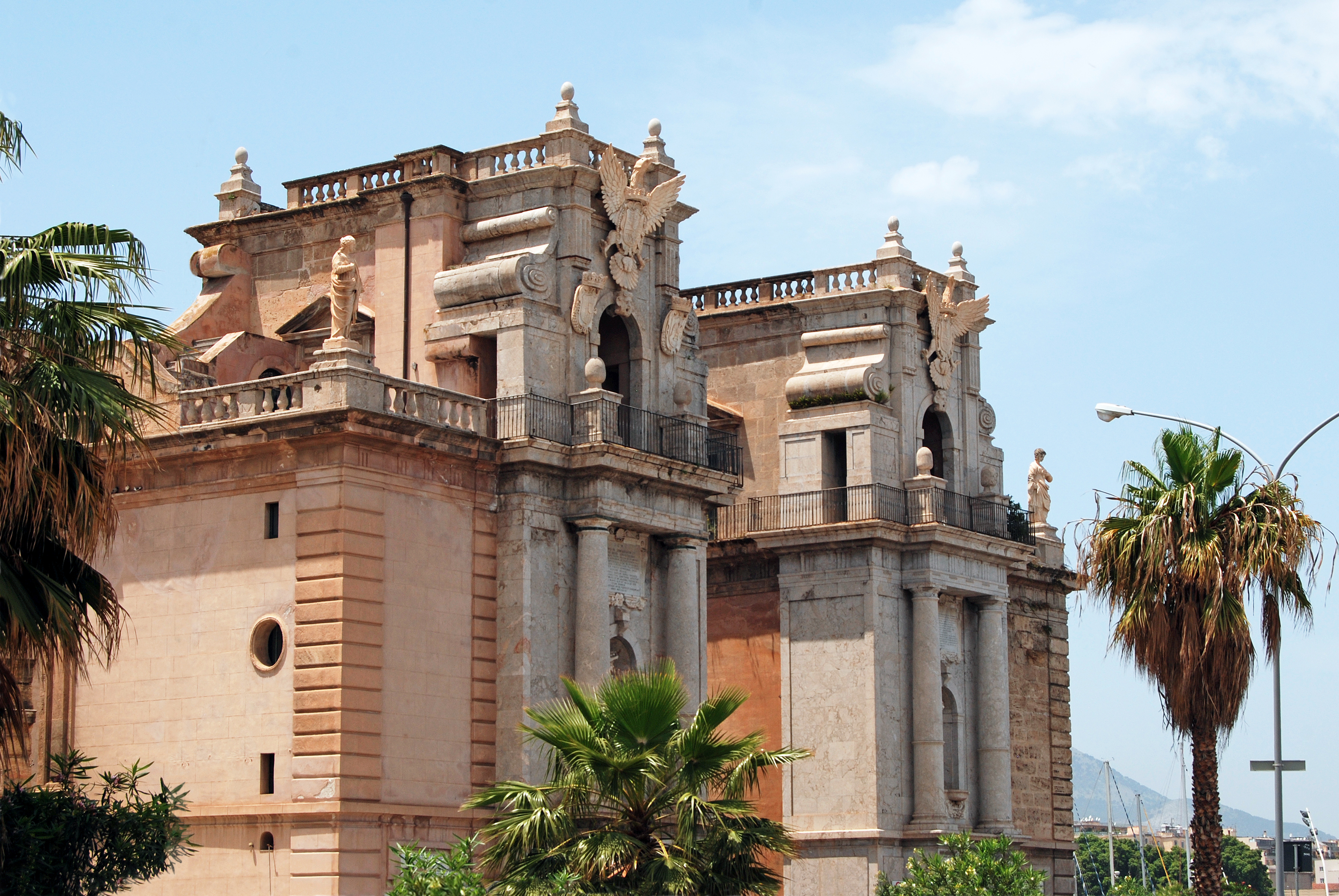
- Porta Felice, Palermo.
- Born: 1561; Palermo, Kingdom of Sicily
- Died: 1636 (aged 75); Palermo, Kingdom of Sicily
- Occupations: architect, painter, decorator

Mariano Smiriglio (1561–1636) was a Sicilian architect, painter and decorator, active in a Mannerist-Sicilian Baroque style in his native Palermo.

He was born in Palermo, and started as a painter at the school of Filippo Paladini, then he worked as an architect. In 1602 Smiriglio became the official architect of the Senate of Palermo. In this capacity, he collaborated with Giulio Lasso for the construction of the Quattro Canti. He was the architect of other landmarks of Palermo: he designed the scenic Porta Felice, Palermo, the Arsenal, fountains and several churches.

Smiriglio died in 1636 in Palermo, and was buried in the Church of the Madonna del Soccorso.

== Works ==
- Porta Felice, Palermo (1602)
- Church of the Madonna del Soccorso, Palermo (1603)
- Church of Sant'Anna la Misericordia, Palermo (1606)
- Church of the Madonna dei Rimedi, Palermo (1610)
- Ossuna Gate (1613, demolished 1872)
- Cathedral of Salemi, Salemi (1615)
- Arsenal of Palermo, Palermo (1621)
- Church of Carmine Maggiore, Palermo (1627)
- Fontana dei due Draghi, Palermo (1630)
- Church of Sant'Antonio di Padova, Palermo (1630)
- Church of Sant'Eulalia dei Catalani, Palermo (1630)
- Church of Santa Maria di Valverde, Palermo (1633)
- Church of San Matteo al Cassaro, Palermo (1633)
