= Albergaria =

Albergaria may refer to:

== People ==
- João Soares de Albergaria, 1st Donatary-Captain of Santa Maria
- Lopo Soares de Albergaria, third Governor of Portuguese India

== Places ==
- Albergaria-a-Velha, municipality in the district of Aveiro, Portugal
- Albergaria, Palermo, a quarter of Palermo, Sicily

== Clubs ==
- Clube de Albergaria, a Portuguese women's football team from Albergaria-a-Velha
