= Juan de Espinosa (composer) =

Spanish composer

Juan de Espinosa (died 1528) was a Spanish composer and music theorist. He claimed to have been in the service of Cardinal Pedro González de Mendoza, Archbishop of Toledo, until Mendoza's death in 1495. He then transferred to the service of another member of the Mendoza family, Cardinal Diego Hurtado de Mendoza, Archbishop of Seville, until this archbishop's death in 1502. In 1507, he assumed the role of maestro de capilla at the Toledo Cathedral.

== Life ==
Espinosa was a bass singer in the Toledo cathedral's choir in 1508, though he may have sung there previously. In 1509, his teaching duties were taken over by Francisco de Lugones, and in 1513, after a dispute with the chapter, he was relegated to only a singer. In 1514, he took a leave of absence, and his name reappears in the cathedral's records in 1528, when his position was advertised and he is presumed to have died. This 14 year gap in the cathedral records was likely due to his new position as an archpriest at Saint Eulalia taking a significant amount of his time. After his service as an archpriest, he went on to become a canon at the Burgos Cathedral.

His controversy with Gonzalo Martínez de Bizcargui, a well documented Spanish theorist and composer, is one of the main reasons his name has been preserved. In his Arte de canto llano et de contrapunto et canto de órgano con proporciones et modos, Bizcargui demonstrates a new approach to composition that Espinosa was not fond of. This plainsong instructor was the most successful instructor published in 16th century Spain. Espinosa attacked Bizcargui in his Retractaciones de los errores et falsedades, defending the traditional style of composition and thereby showcasing the fame Bizcargui's compositional prowess had brought him.

== Music ==
=== Villancicos ===
- Enemiga le soy, madre
- De vosotros, é mansilla.
