= Oratorio di San Giuseppe dei Falegnami, Palermo =

Baroque oratory in Sicily, Italy

Oratory of St Joseph of the Carpenters
- Oratorio di San Giuseppe dei Falegnami
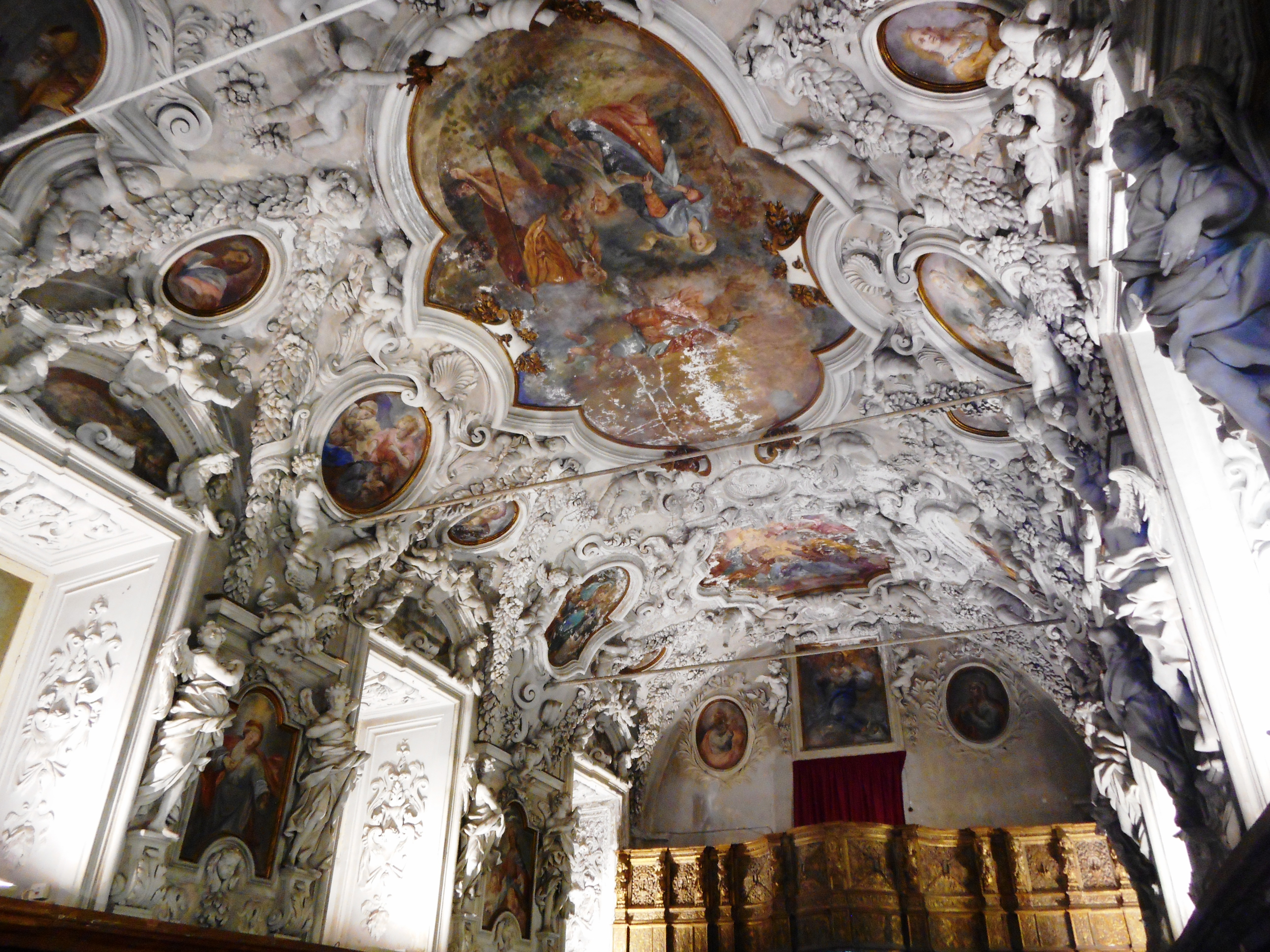

Religion
- Affiliation: Roman Catholic
- Province: Archdiocese of Palermo
- Rite: Roman Rite

Location
- Location: Palermo, Italy
- Interactive map of Oratory of St Joseph of the Carpenters
- Coordinates: 38°06′46.75″N 13°21′46.73″E

Architecture
- Style: Sicilian Baroque

The Oratorio di San Giuseppe dei Falegnami is a Baroque prayer room or oratory located across the Via Giuseppe d'Alessi from the church of San Giuseppe dei Teatini in the quarter of the Albergaria, within the historic centre of Palermo, region of Sicily, Italy.

== History ==
The oratory was founded in 1603, and is now located in the building housing the law (giurisprudenza) faculty of the Università di Palermo. The interiors are decorated with both woodwork and stuccoes by Giuseppe Serpotta. Some frescoes painted by Pietro Novelli were transferred to the regional art museum at the Palazzo Abatellis. The remaining frescoes were painted in the late 18th-century. The wooden tableuxs with episodes of the life of Christ were completed by Baldassare Pampilonia.
