= Sant'Alessandro dei Carbonai =

Church building in Castellammare, Italy

St Alexander of the Charcoal-workers
- Sant'Alessandro dei Carbonai
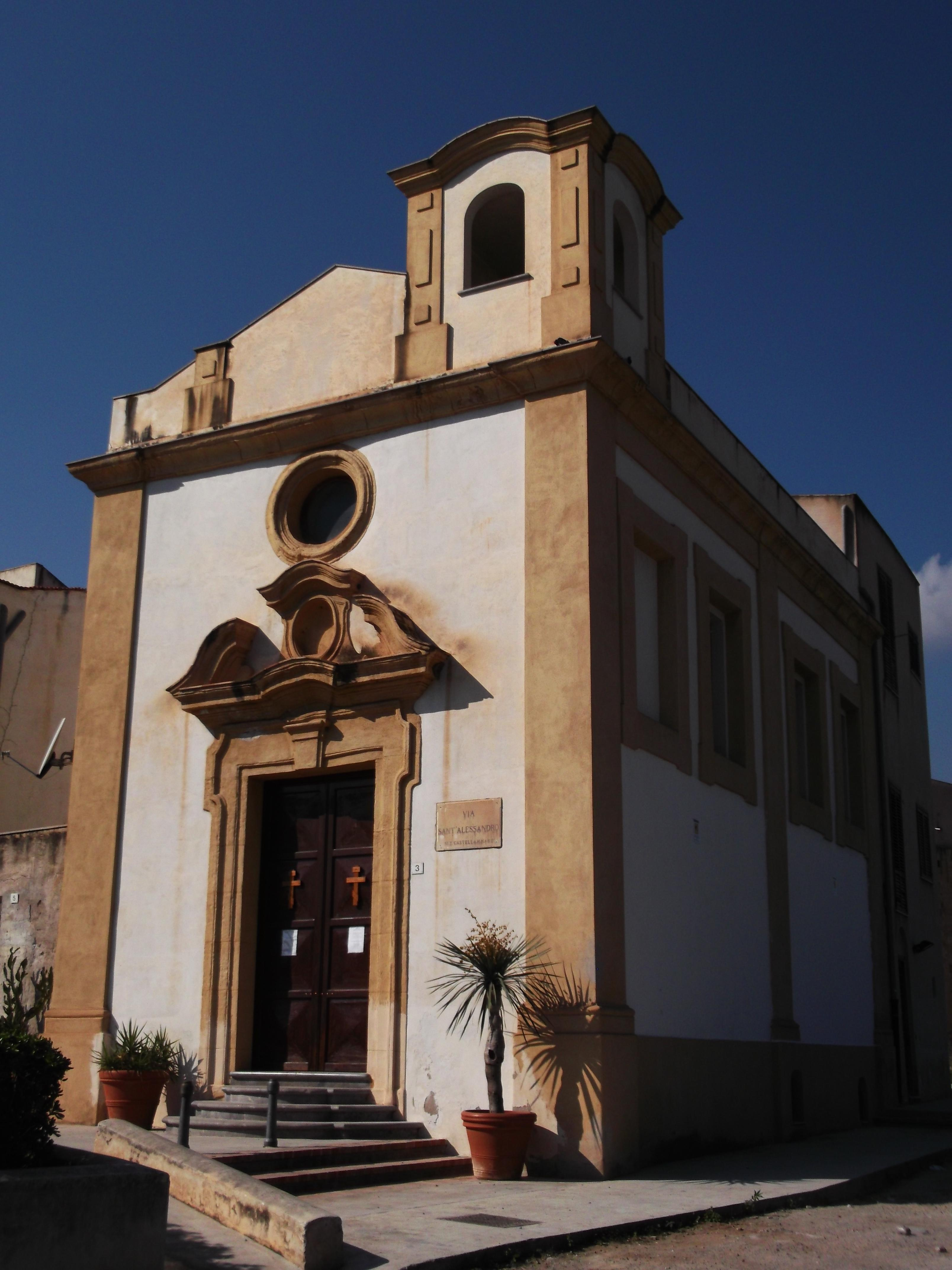
- Facade of church

Location
- Location: Palermo, Italy
- Interactive map of St Alexander of the Charcoal-workers
- Coordinates: 38.12124°N 13.36535°E

Architecture
- Style: Sicilian Baroque

Sant'Alessandro dei Carbonai is a small Baroque-style church located on Via Sant'Alessandro, near the port area, in the ancient quarter of Castellammare, in central Palermo, region of Sicily, Italy. The church now hosts Russian Orthodox services.

== History ==
This small church was originally built from 1725-1737 under the patronage of the Confraternity of the Carbonai (the coal merchants' guild).

It was dedicated to Saint Alexander of Comana, the patron saint of the charcoal workers.

In the 19th century, the church was converted for at time into an arsenal. It was reconsecrated in 1870.

During the aerial allied bombardment in 1943, the church was significantly damaged.

Falling further into ruin, for years it was occupied by various families. Restoration was pursued in 2000, when a crypt was discovered. For a time it was used for art exhibits.

In 2013, the church was given to the Russian Orthodox Church.
