= San Giovanni dell'Origlione =

Deconsecrated church in Palermo, Italy

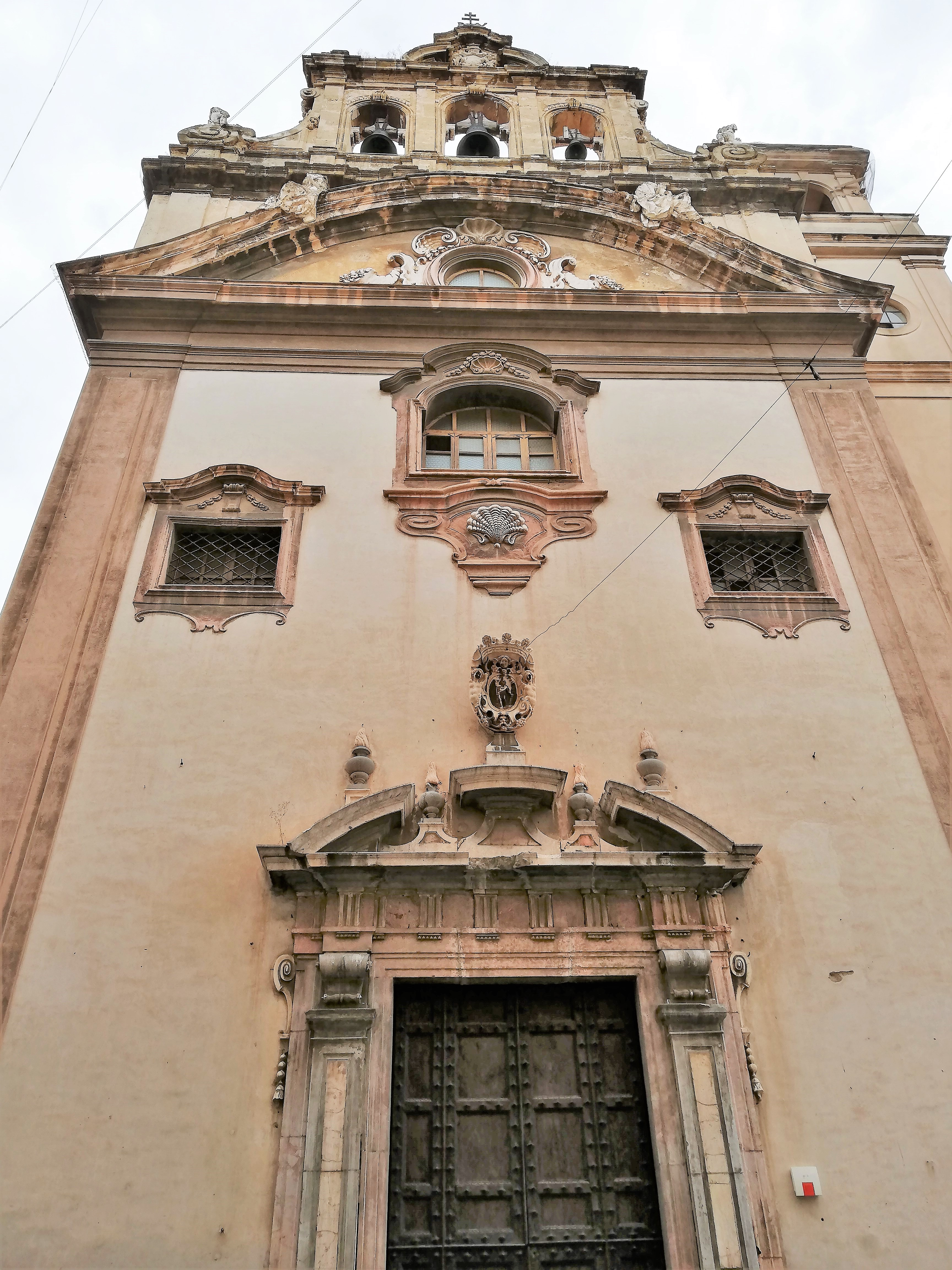
- Exterior of the Church

Religion
- Affiliation: Roman Catholic
- Province: Archdiocese of Palermo
- Rite: Roman Rite

Location
- Location: Palermo, Italy
- Interactive map of San Giovanni dell'Origlione
- Coordinates: 38.11342°N 13.35875°E

Architecture
- Style: Baroque architecture
- Groundbreaking: 17th century

San Giovanni dell'Origlione is a Baroque-style, deconsecrated, Roman Catholic church located on Piazza Origlione, at the intersection of via Saladino and via Santissimo Salvatore in the ancient quarter of Albergaria of the city of Palermo, region of Sicily, Italy. It was once attached to a convent of cloistered Benedictine nuns, but after years of abandon, is presently undergoing restoration.

== History ==
The derivation of Origlione is murky. In documents referring to the Norman era, a monastery was named St Joannis de Ruchono and it may have a derivation from the Latin root of the word religion. Prior to the 1300s, there was a large benedictine monastery in this area, founded by the Knights Hospitaller (Cavalieri Gerosolimitani). A church was built in the 17th century and refurbished in 1782. By the 19th century, the convent was housing nuns, and they were expelled during the suppression of the orders in 1866. The church was later reopened as a parish church, and dedicated to St Benedict of Nursia (San Benedetto). Poorly maintained, the church was heavily damaged by the allied bombardments in 1943. Left in ruin, some of the surrounding buildings became the middle school Giovanni Verga.

The interior maintains some of the Stucco decoration in the apse. The church was linked to the monastery by a cloistered walkway. The tall facade has tall windows with metal grills that opened to the nuns gallery.

In the 21st century, the church, whose interior nave is virtually barren of painted decoration, has been undergoing a long process of renovation funded by the government in collaboration with both the archdiocese and other local organizations. During work, a damaged fresco depicting the Triumph of David by Pietro Novelli was discovered.
