= San Matteo al Cassaro =

Roman Catholic church in Palermo, Italy

Church of Saint Matthew
- Chiesa di San Matteo al Cassaro (Italian)
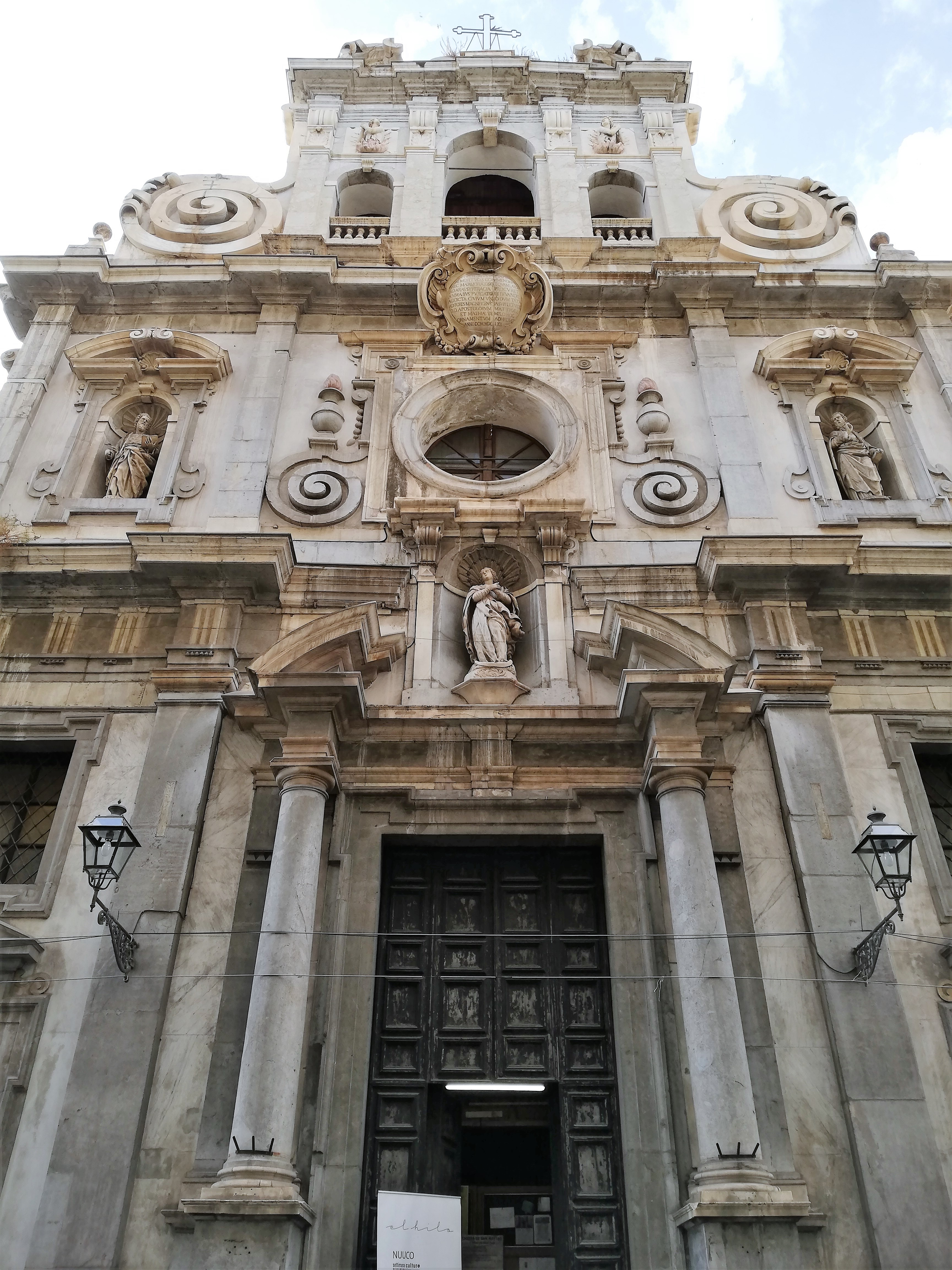
- Façade of the church

Religion
- Affiliation: Roman Catholic
- Province: Archdiocese of Palermo
- Rite: Roman Rite
- Year consecrated: 1647

Location
- Location: Palermo, Italy
- Interactive map of Church of Saint Matthew
- Coordinates: 38°06′58.81″N 13°21′45.5″E

Architecture
- Architect: Mariano Smiriglio
- Style: Sicilian Baroque
- Groundbreaking: 1633
- Completed: 1664

The Church of San Matteo al Cassaro (Italian: Chiesa di San Matteo al Cassaro; English: Church of Saint Matthew at Cassaro) is a Baroque-style, Roman Catholic church of Palermo, region of Sicily, Italy. It is located in the main street of the city, the ancient Cassaro now Corso Vittorio Emanuele, in the quarter of the Loggia, about a block east of the Quattro Canti, within the historic centre of Palermo.

The church was built between 1633 and 1664 by the will of the Miseremini confraternity, dedicated to prayers for souls in Purgatory. The building was probably designed by the architect of the Senate of Palermo, Mariano Smiriglio, but was completed by Gaspare Guercio and Carlo D'Aprile. It is decorated with many works of important Sicilian artists like Vito D'Anna, Pietro Novelli, Giacomo Serpotta, Giuseppe Testa (painter), Bartolomeo Sanseverino, Filippo Randazzo, Antonio Manno, Francesco Sozzi.

The church is also connected to the palermitan legend of the Beati Paoli.

== Gallery ==
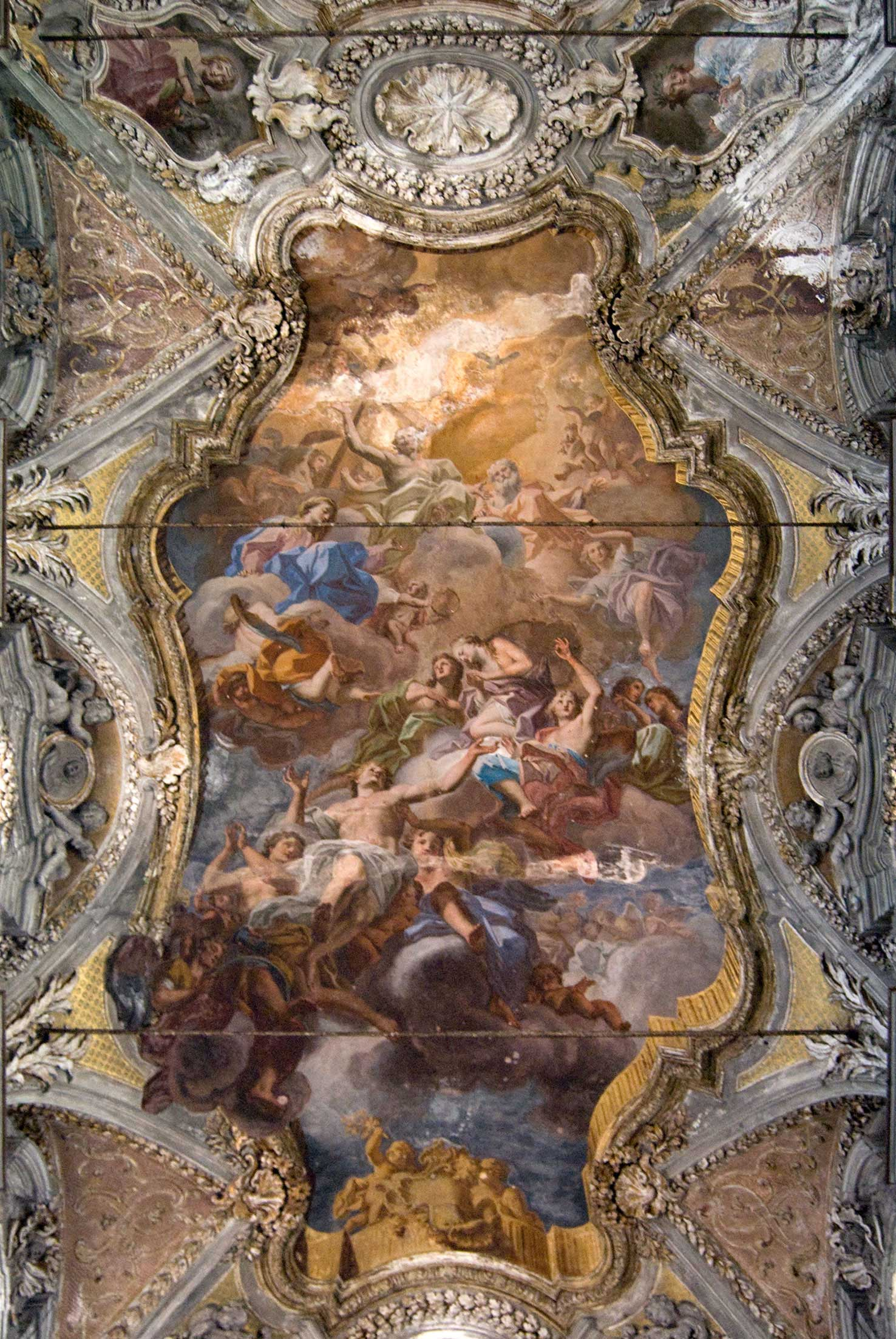
Triumph of the Souls in Purgatory (vault) by Vito D'Anna

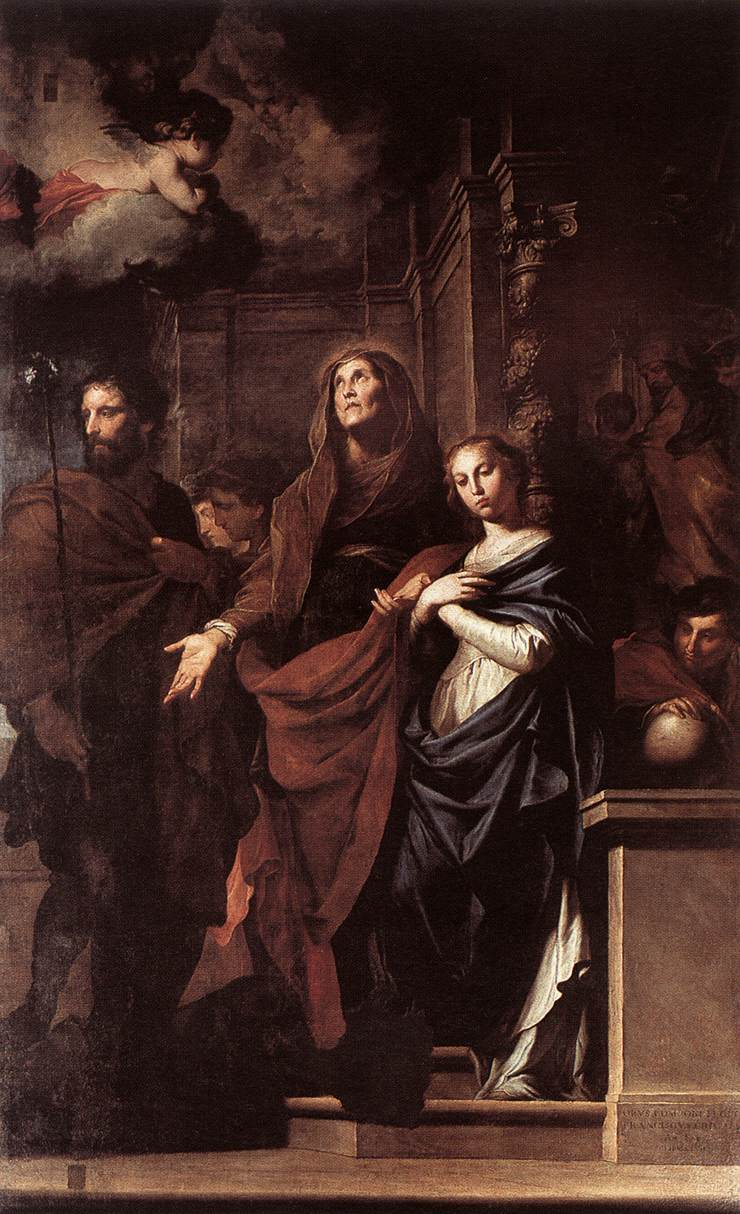
Marriage of the Virgin by Pietro Novelli

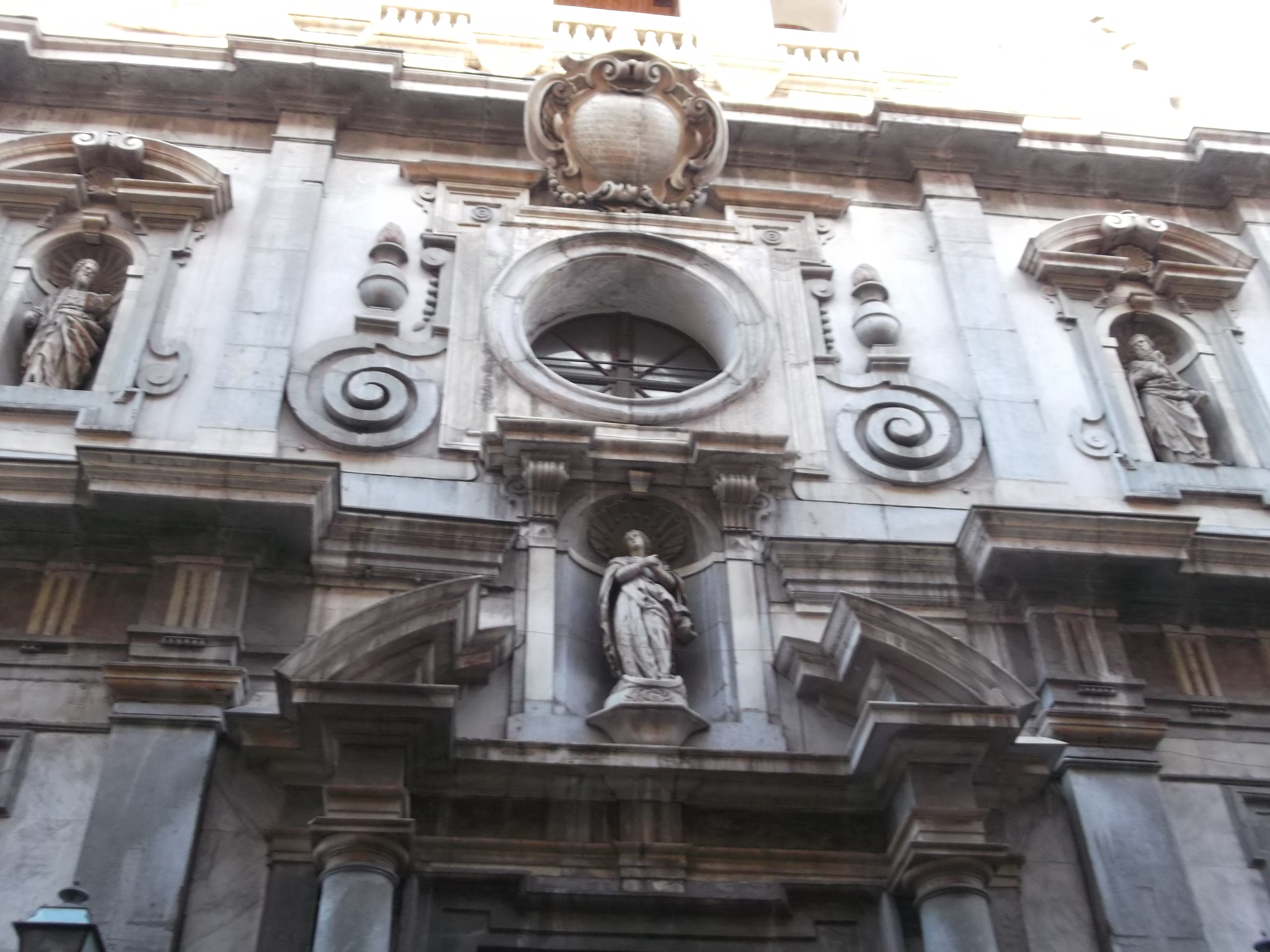
Facade, sculptures of Carlo D'Aprile

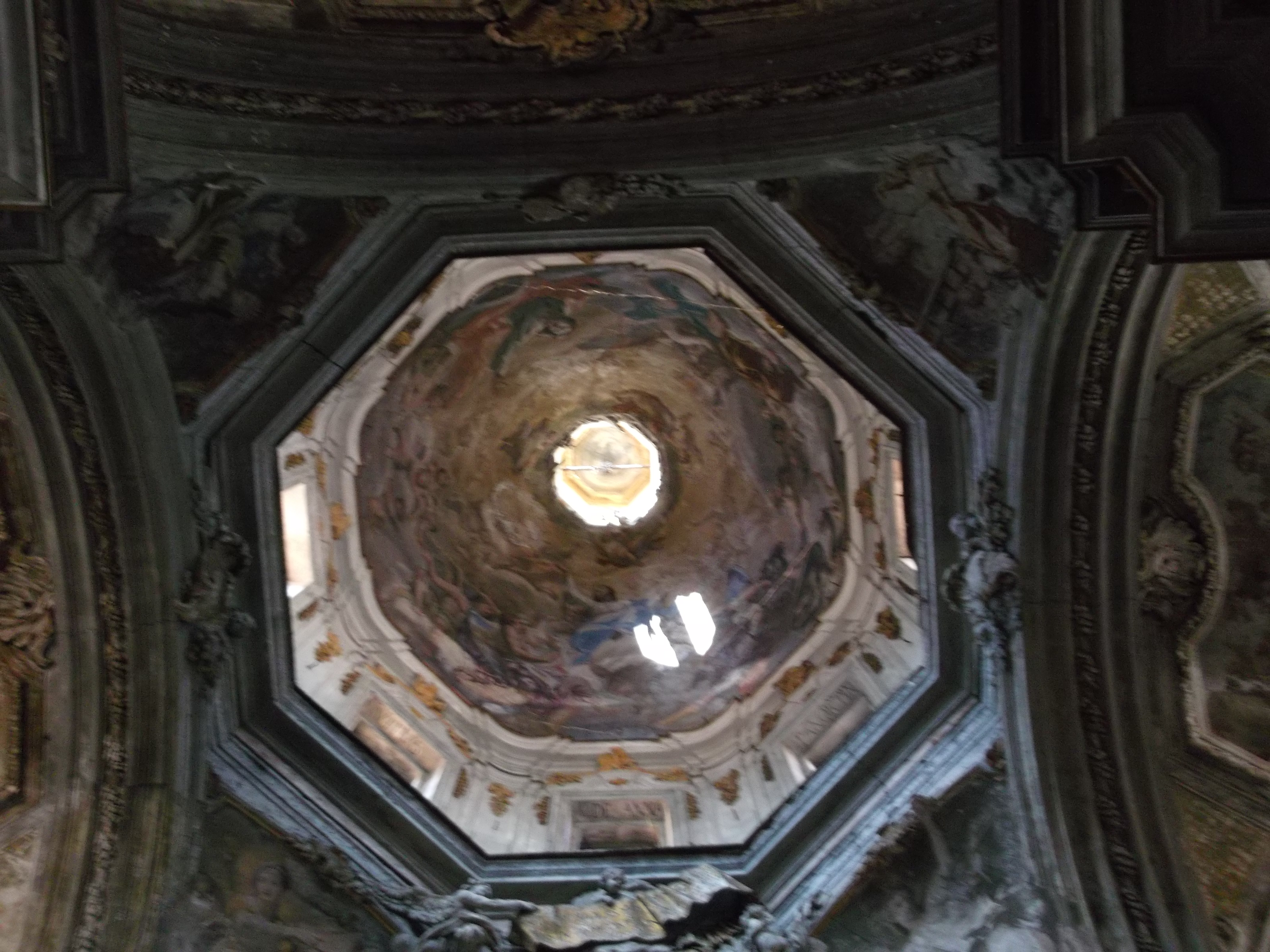
The dome, interior
