= Giuseppe Serpotta =

Sicilian sculptor

Giuseppe Serpotta (1653–1719) was a Sicilian sculptor, the brother of the famous stucco sculptor Giacomo Serpotta (1652–1732). He died in Palermo.
