= Santa Maria degli Agonizzanti, Palermo =

Roman Catholic church in Palermo, Italy

Santa Maria degli Agonizzanti
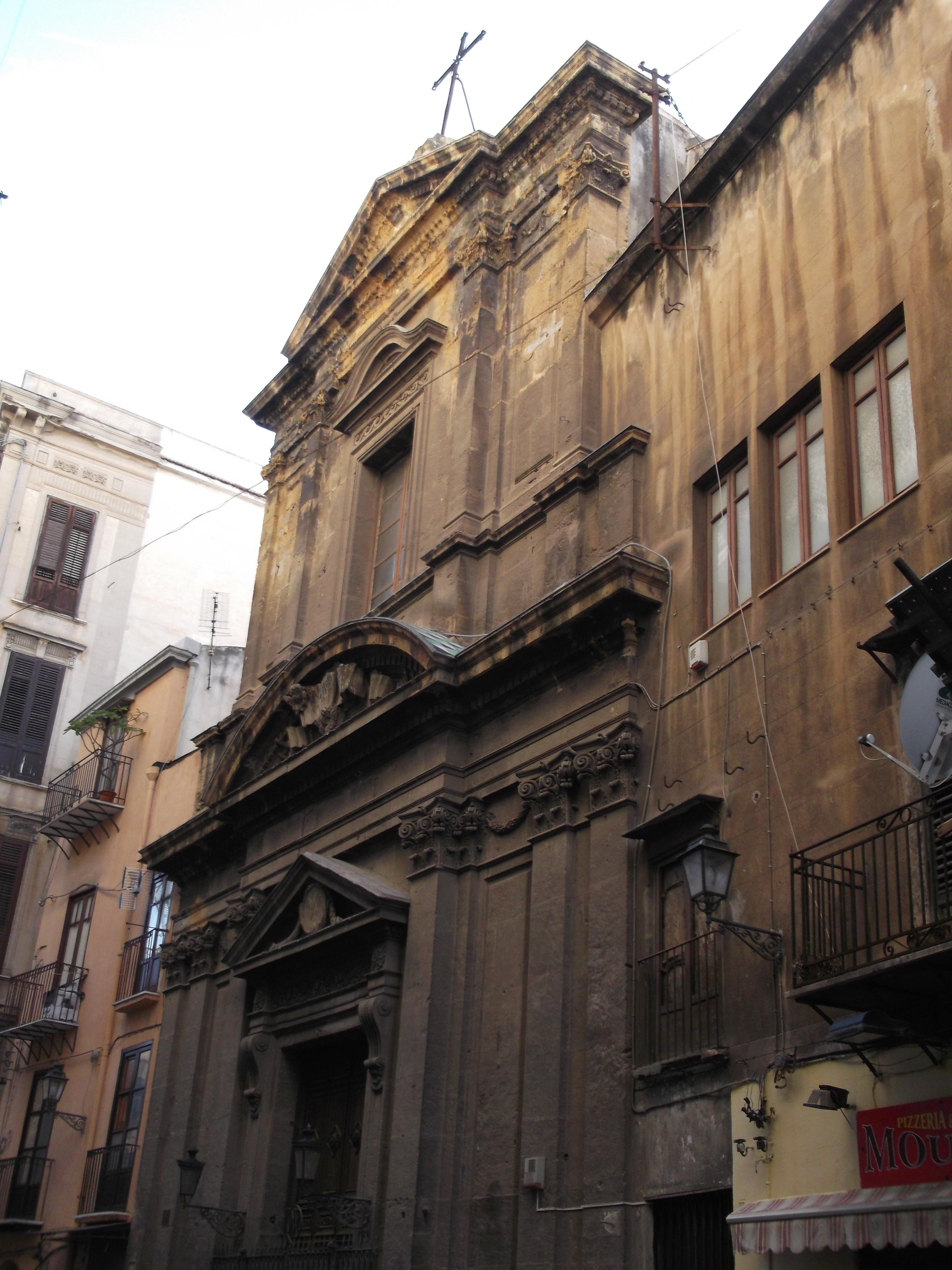
- Facade of the church

Religion
- Affiliation: Roman Catholic
- Province: Archdiocese of Palermo
- Rite: Roman Rite

Location
- Location: Palermo, Italy
- Interactive map of Santa Maria degli Agonizzanti
- Coordinates: 38°06′56.88″N 13°22′21.72″E

Architecture
- Architect: Antonio Interguglielmi

Santa Maria degli Agonizzanti or Holy Mary of those in agony) is a Baroque-style, Roman Catholic church located on via Giovanni da Procida, just south of Via Roma, in central Palermo, region of Sicily, Italy. It is located in the quarter of the Kalsa, within the historic centre of Palermo.

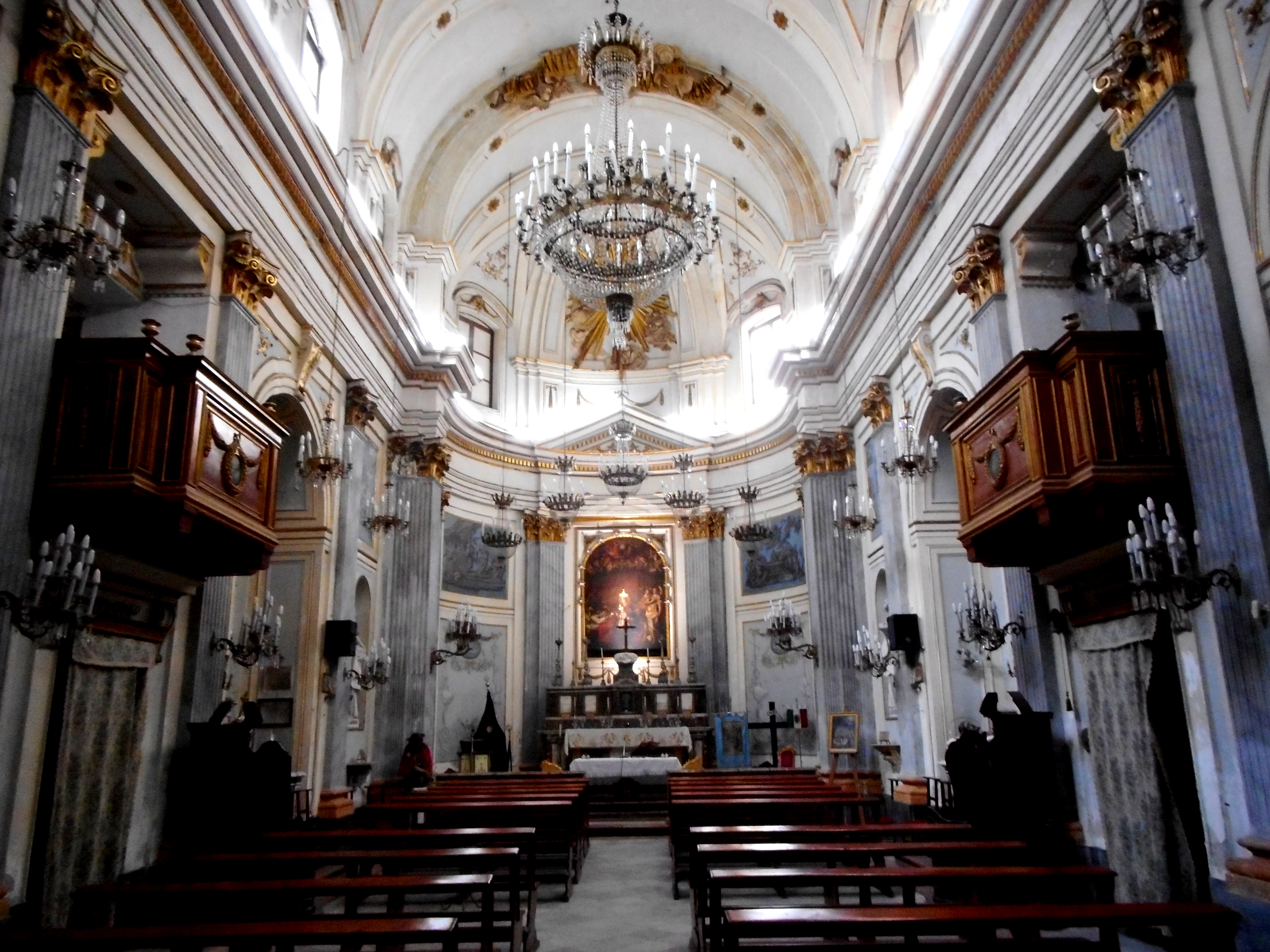
Interior of church towards apse.

The church was founded in 1630 under the patronage of the Confraternity of Santa Maria degli Agonizzanti, which ministered to those condemned to execution. This function seems to have shifted in 1799, when executions were performed near the Ponte dell'Ammiraglio, and the decapitated bodies buried in a common fossa in a park that stood in front of the small church, once known as the Madonna del Fiume due to the nearby Oreto River, but presently as the Sanctuario ai Decollati (Sanctuary for the Decapitated). Burials here ceased in 1867.

In 1784, the church was refurbished by the architect Antonio Interguglielmi. The interior has a restrained neoclassical decoration. In the apse are frescoes depicting the Life of the Virgin Mary by Elia Interguglielmi, brother of Antonio. The main altar was decorated with works by Ignazio Marabitti. The statues of the four doctors of the Church, which line the nave, were completed by Gaspare Firriolo.
