= Santa Sofia dei Tavernieri =

Former oratory or small church building in Sicily, Italy

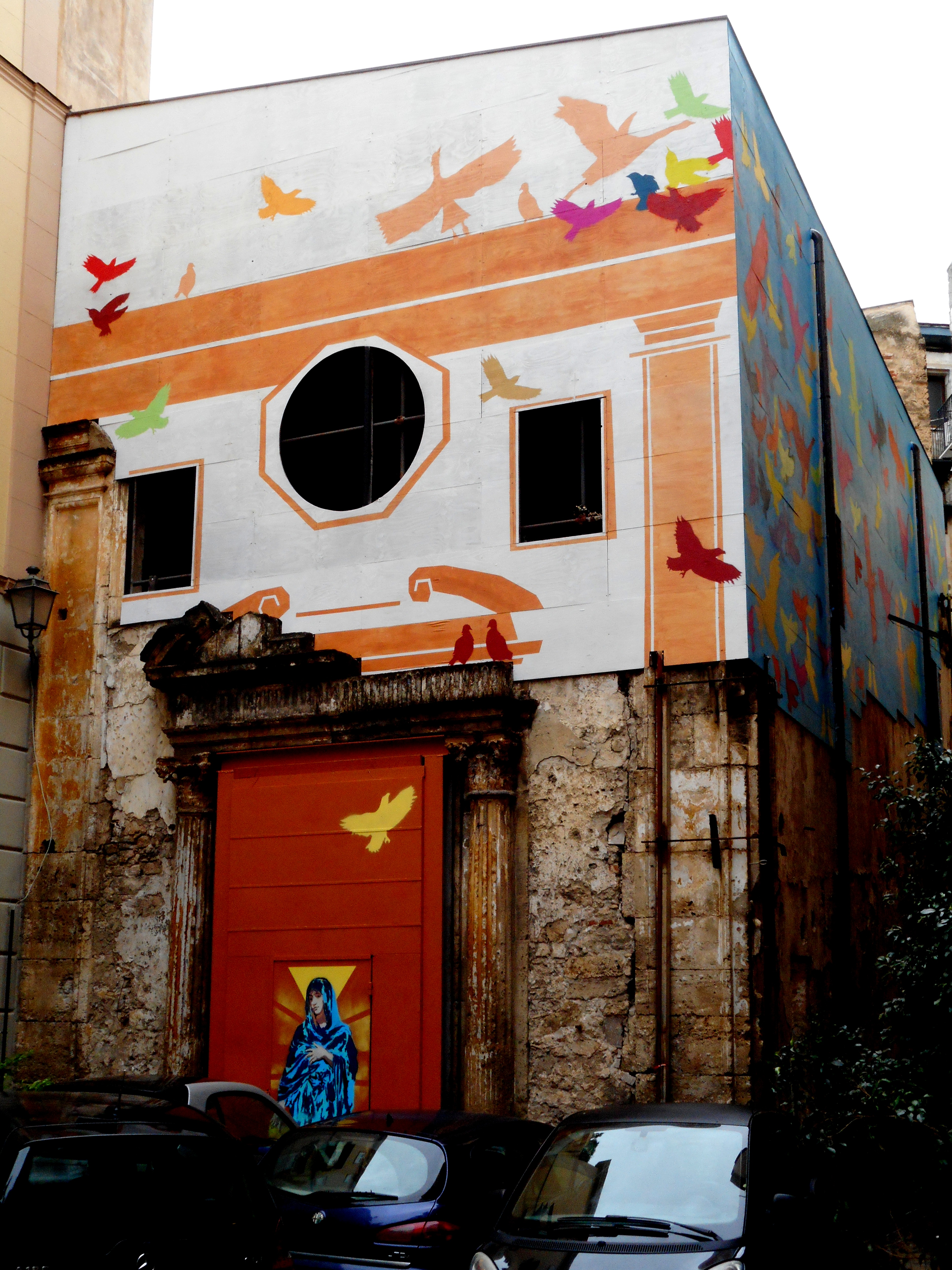
- Ruins of the Façade of the church

Religion
- Affiliation: deconsecrated
- Year consecrated: circa 1600
- Status: ruins

Location
- Location: Palermo, Italy
- Interactive map of Santa Sofia dei Tavernieri
- Coordinates: 38.11710°N 13.36426°E

Santa Sofia dei Tavernieri is a former oratory or small church building located in central Palermo, region of Sicily, Italy. It is located just off the main street of the city, the ancient Cassaro now Corso Vittorio Emanuele, in the quarter of the Loggia. About a block and a half east of Via Roma, to the north opens a narrow vicolo Mezzani, off which a few meters in opens the vicolo Santa Sofia, opening to a small piazza with the ruins of the facade of the church.

This small church was commissioned by the a Lombard confraternity of Tavernieri (inn-keepers). Initially meeting in the church of the Crocifisso, in the Albergheria, In 1589, they bought land at this site, and erected first a chapel, enlarging it in 1606 with the site of an adjacent house. Over the years, the site became little utilized, including when it became part of a confraternity of the injured victims of war. An allied aerial bomb in 1943 left the site in ruins. Despite claims of restoration, it remains a ruin.
