= Oratorio del Carminello, Palermo =

Oratory in Palermo, Sicily

Oratory of the Carminello
- Oratorio del Carminello
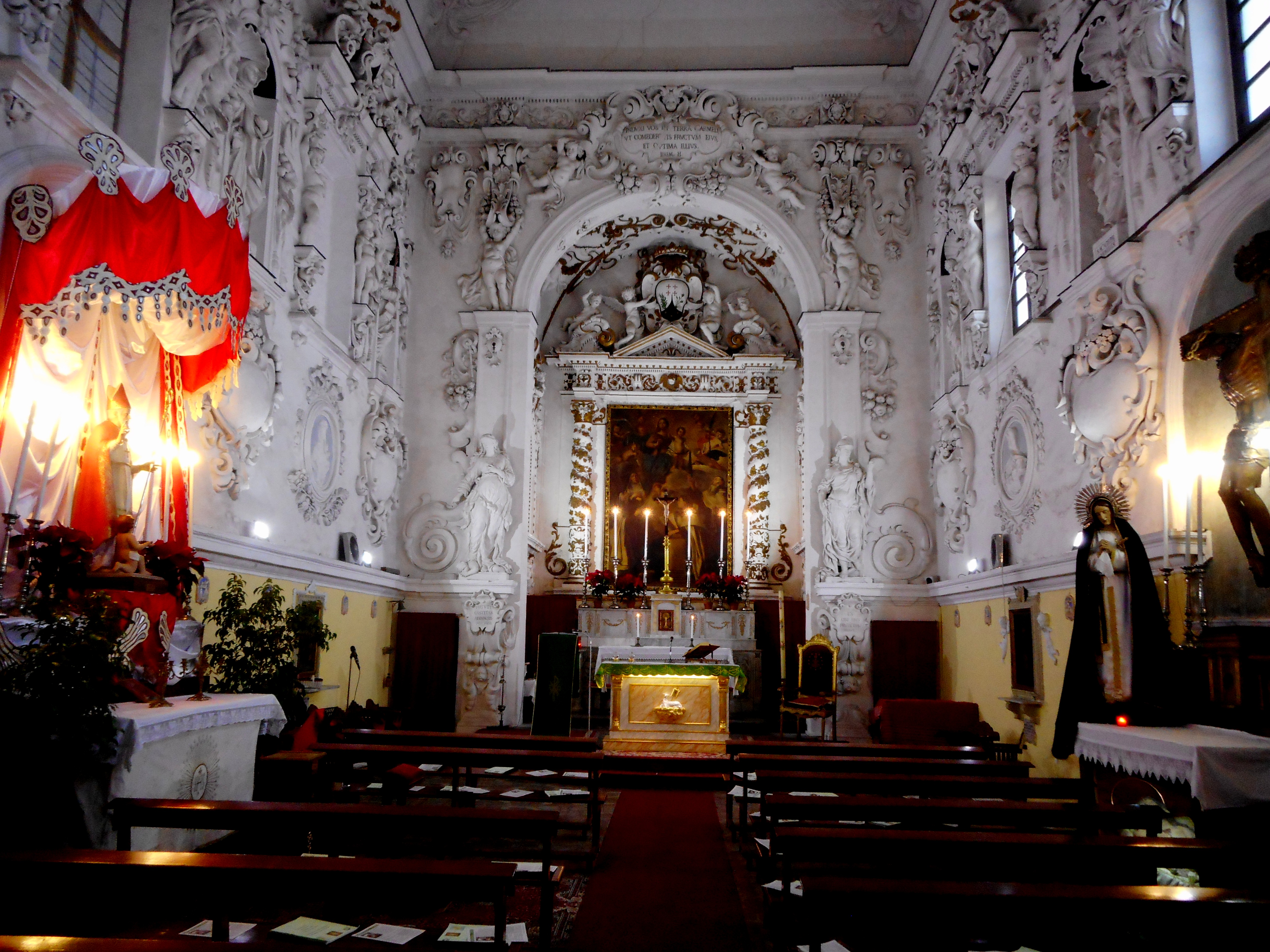
- Interior of oratory

Religion
- Affiliation: Roman Catholic
- Province: Archdiocese of Palermo
- Rite: Roman Rite

Location
- Location: Palermo, Italy
- Interactive map of Oratory of the Carminello
- Coordinates: 38.10997°N 13.36172°E

Architecture
- Style: Sicilian Baroque

The Oratorio del Carminello is a Baroque prayer room or oratory located on Via Porta San Agata in the quarter of the Albergaria, within the historic centre of Palermo, region of Sicily, Italy.

== History ==
The oratory was founded in 1605 and decorated over the next two centuries with a rich stucco decoration, including statues of saints and beatified members of the Carmelite order. The order was affiliated with a number of churches in Palermo, including the Carmine Maggiore a few blocks away.

The exterior of the oratory, as is common, is sober and simple marked by a single portal. The interior has the elaborate stucco work was done mainly by Procopio Serpota. The main altar has coat of arms of the Carmelites, held up by putti above the tympanum, and is flanked by allegorical statues depicting Chastity and Divine Love. The crypt below was used to desiccate cadavers.
