= Madonna dei Rimedi, Palermo =

Roman Catholic Sanctuary-church in Palermo, Italy

Coordinates: 38.10989°N 13.35036°E

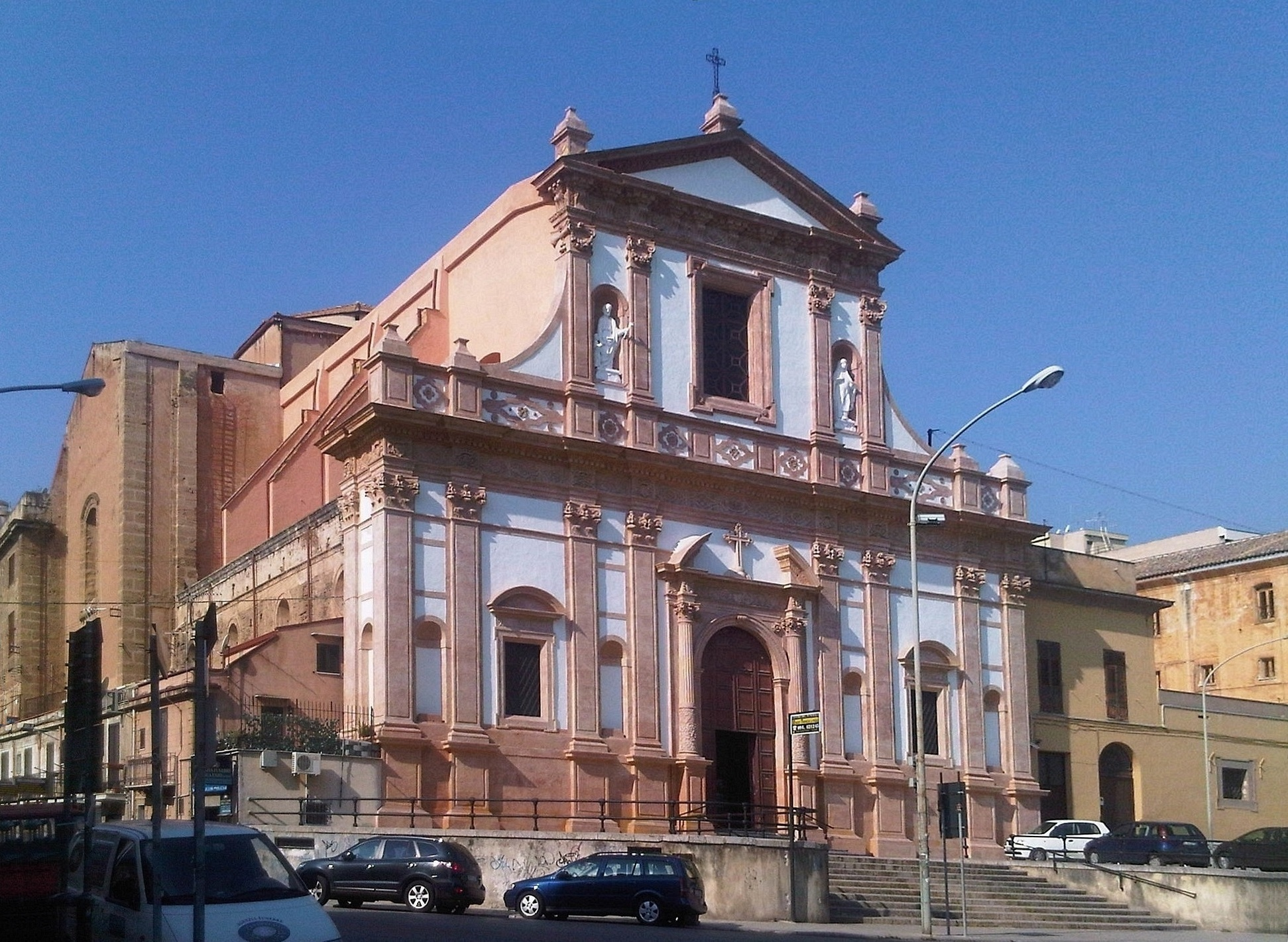
Facade of church

Madonna dei Rimedi (Our Lady of the Remedies) is a Baroque-style, Roman Catholic Sanctuary-church, established and still affiliated with the Discalced Carmelite order, located on Piazza Indipendenza # 9, in Palermo, region of Sicily, Italy.

== History ==
A church was erected on the site soon after the conquest of Saracen Palermo by the Normans in 1064. The Norman troops were attempting to penetrate the walls of the town, but their camp outside the city was afflicted by poisonous spiders. A Norman warrior in a dream was led by the Virgin Mary to a fire that was used to kill the plague of spiders. A vow was made to erect a church once the onslaught was successful, and soon after 1072, Roger I of Sicily erected a small church at the site where the fire was obtained, and called it Santa Maria dei Rimedi.

In 1610, the small church was donated to the Carmelite order, who with the support of the viceroy Juan Fernandez Pacheco, was able to build the present larger church and an adjacent convent, completed in 1625 and refurbished in the first half of the 19th century. Another story is that the viceroy initially planned to remove the Carmelites from this site, but a vision of the Virgin in a dream forestalled the plan.

The church and convent were suppressed in 1866, and for a time, the complex was used as a barracks. Only in 1949, under Cardinal Ernesto Ruffini was the church reassigned to the Carmelite order. A number of works were reassigned to the church or made for this sanctuary. The earthquake of 2002 uncovered some weaknesses in the structure, and repairs have been ongoing.

The church was designed by Mariano Smiriglio. Flanking the large central window on the facade are statues of Santa Teresa of Avila and St Joseph and young Jesus. To the right of the church is the former monastery. Among the artworks in the church is a canvas depicting the Transverberation of Santa Teresa painted by Rosalia Novelli, daughter of Pietro Novelli. In the sacristy is a St Bartholemew by Spagnoletto; in the third chapel on the right is an altarpiece depicting a Holy Family with, Mary, young Jesus, St Anne and young John the Baptist by Pietro Novelli; another Holy family by Novelli is found in the church. A Return of the Holy Family from Egypt by Novelli is now in Palazzo Abatellis. A painting by Olivio Sozzi made for the chapel of St. John of the Cross is now at the church of the Carmine a san Giuseppe.
