= Santa Maria della Catena, Palermo =

Church in Palermo, Italy

Church of Saint Mary of the Chain
- Chiesa di Santa Maria della Catena (Italian)
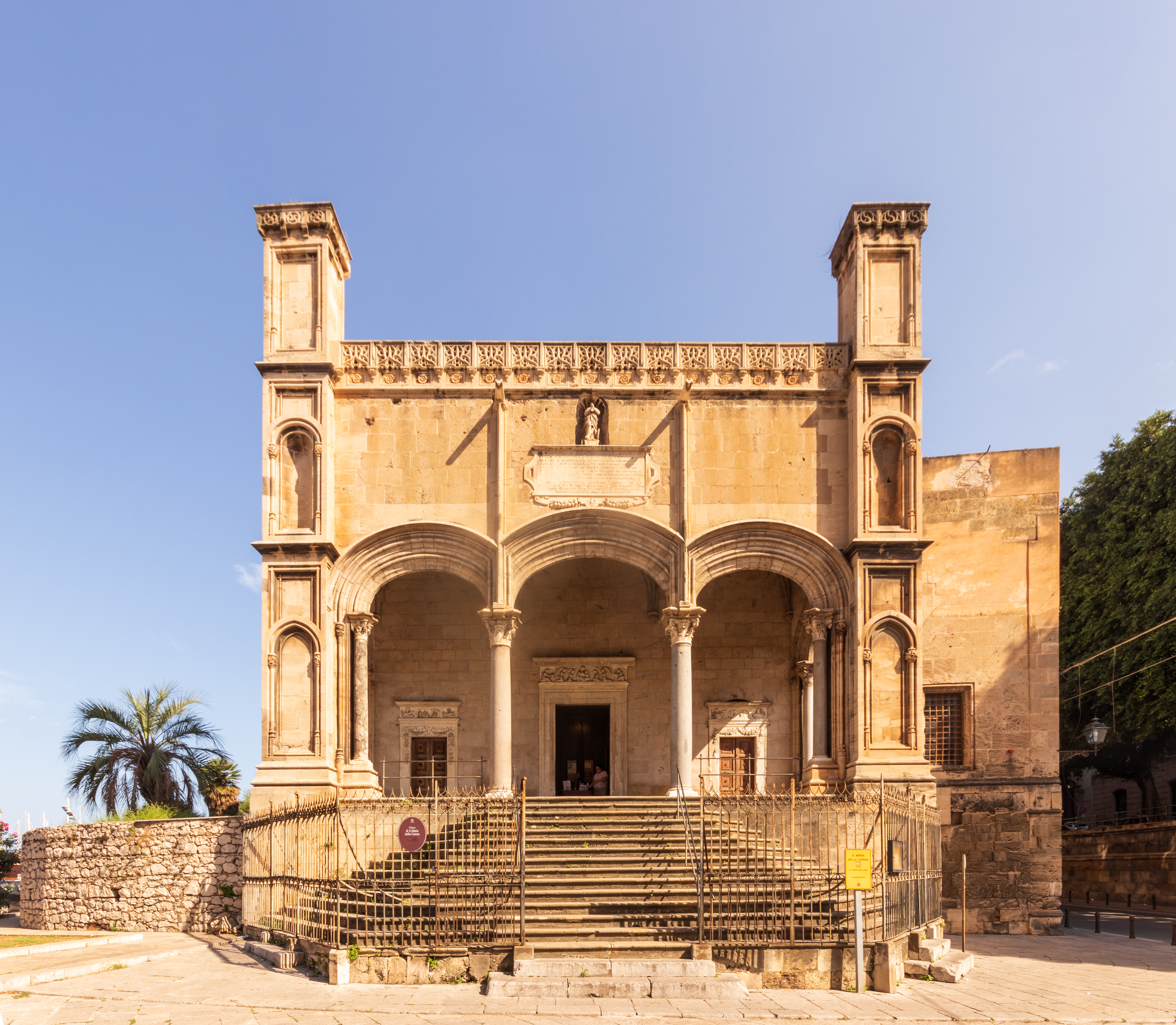
- The Catalan Gothic porch

Religion
- Affiliation: Roman Catholic
- Province: Archdiocese of Palermo
- Rite: Roman Rite

Location
- Location: Palermo, Italy
- Interactive map of Church of Saint Mary of the Chain
- Coordinates: 38°07′09.15″N 13°22′10.51″E

Architecture
- Style: Catalan Gothic
- Groundbreaking: 1490
- Completed: 1520

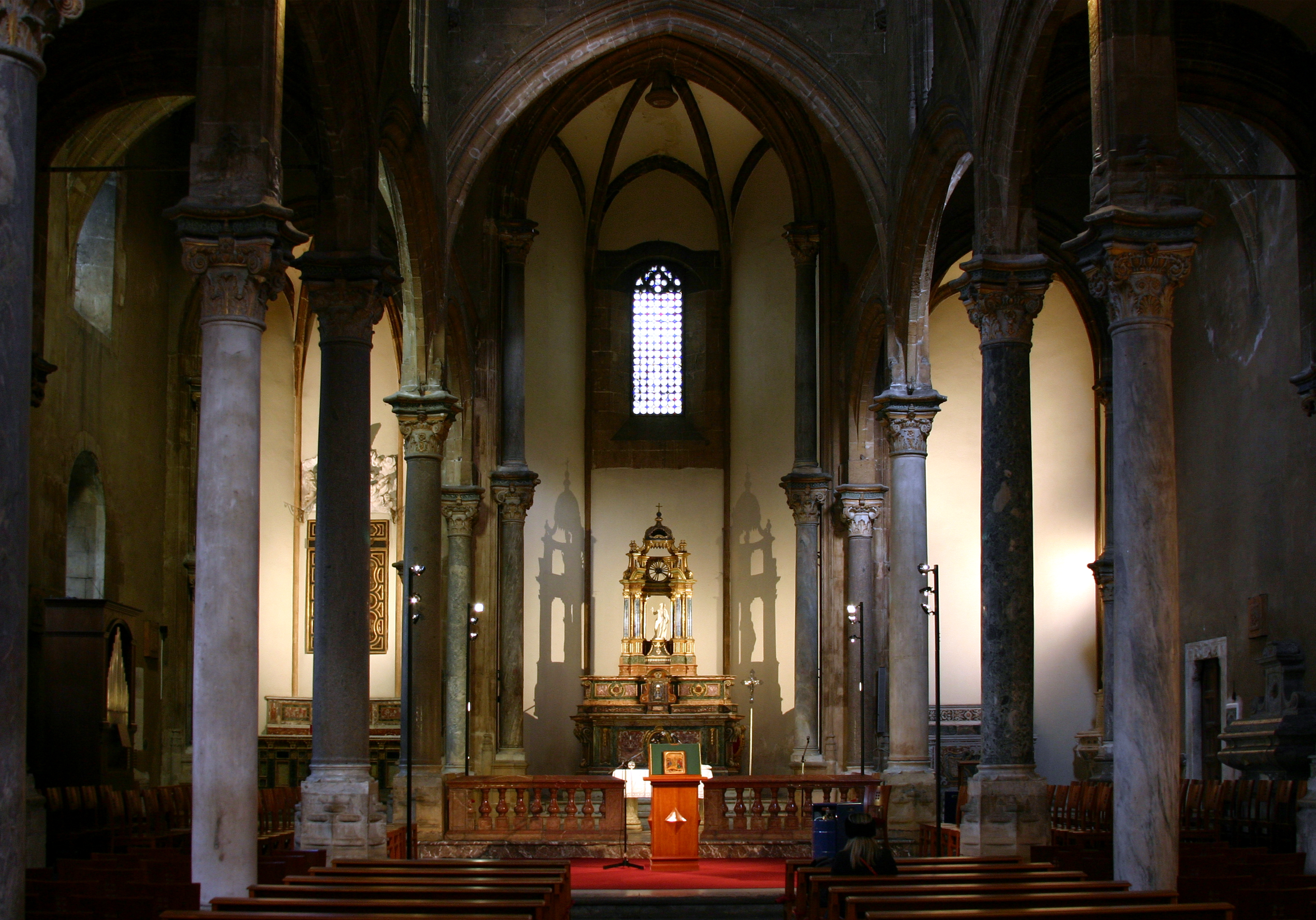
Interior

Santa Maria della Catena is a Roman Catholic church located in the Piazza Dogana, now sandwiched between Strada Statale 113 and Via Vittorio Emanuele, located in the harbor-hugging quarter of Castellammare in Palermo, region of Sicily, Italy.

== History ==
The church was built in 1490-1520, putatively designed by Matteo Carnilivari. The tag of the chain (Italian: catena) derives from the presence, on one of the walls, of a chain which closed the Cala port. The chains were putatively originally a prize acquired from the defeat of a marauding Pisan fleet.

The architecture of the church mixes late Renaissance style and Gothic-Catalan style, the latter especially visible in the three-part arcaded loggia located at the top of the entry staircase (added in 1845). The interior is also late Gothic, and includes a canvas depicting Nativity with Adoration of the Shepherds (17th century) by an unknown master, and 16th-century bas-reliefs attributed to Vincenzo and Antonello Gagini, who also sculpted the capitals of the columns and the entrance portals. Traces of frescoes by Olivio Sozzi remain in one of the chapels.

Annexed to the church is a 1602 convent house, which in 1844 was converted into a state archive.
