= Sant'Agostino, Palermo =

Church in Palermo, Italy

Church of Saint Augustine
- Chiesa di Sant'Agostino (in Italian)
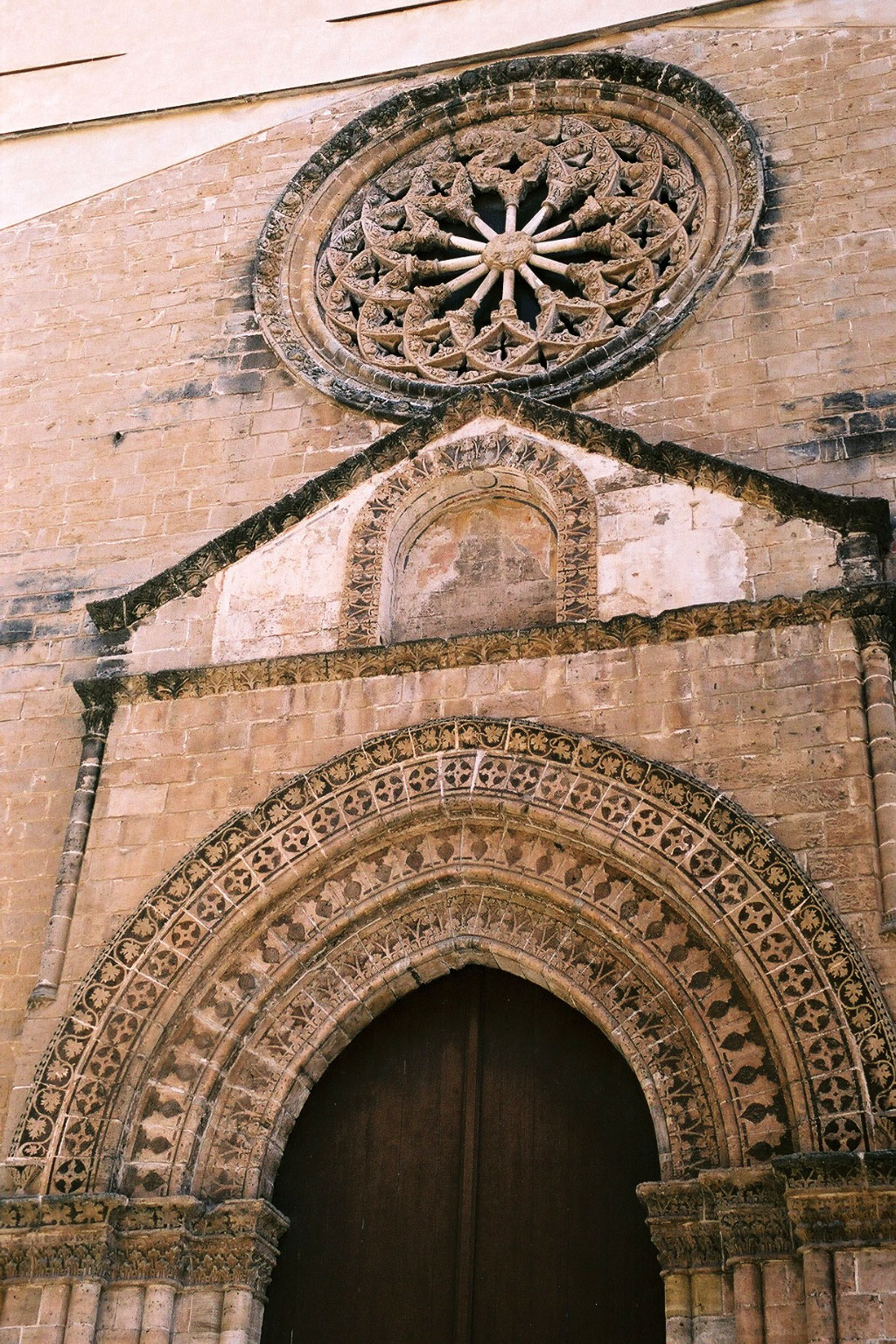
- Entrance and rose window

Religion
- Affiliation: Roman Catholic
- Province: Archdiocese of Palermo
- Rite: Roman Rite

Location
- Location: Palermo, Italy
- Interactive map of Church of Saint Augustine
- Coordinates: 38°07′05.19″N 13°21′27.28″E

Architecture
- Style: Gothic and Sicilian Baroque

The Church of Saint Augustine (Italian: Chiesa di Sant'Agostino) is a Gothic church of Palermo. It is located near the market of the Capo, in the quarter of the Seralcadio, within the historic centre of Palermo. The church is also called Santa Rita, because of the devotion to this Augustinian saint.

The church was built during the Angevin period replacing an earlier church that dated back to the Hauteville era. The building was subject to subsequent changes over the centuries. In the 18th century the sculptor Giacomo Serpotta created a sumptuous stucco decoration inside the church.
