= Sant'Eulalia dei Catalani =

Deconsecrated church in Sicily, Italy

Coordinates: 38.12°N 13.36°E

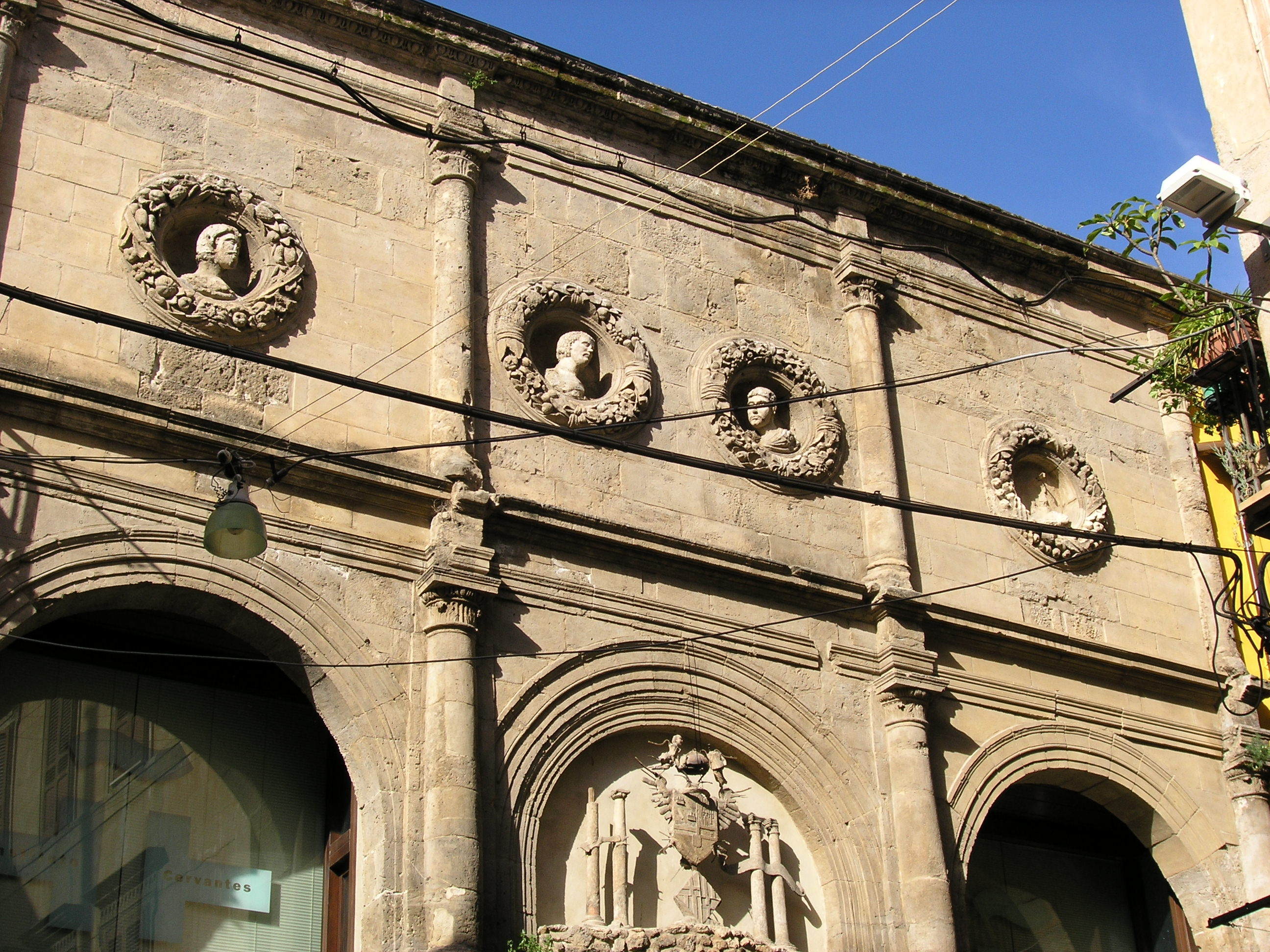
View of the upper façade.

Sant'Eulalia dei Catalani is a deconsecrated church, whose Renaissance facade can still be seen on Via Argenteria #19, at the edge of the lively Vucciria market in ancient quarter of Castellammare in central Palermo, region of Sicily, Italy. In a niche in the small piazza in front of the church is a statue of the Genius of Palermo, sculpted by Pietro di Bonitate in 1483, and now called Palermu lu Grandi.

== History ==
The church was built in the 15th century, during the Aragonese rule of Sicily, with the financial support of Catalan merchants that were working in the city. Initially it was dedicated to Virgin Mary, and only later the naming was switched to the current Santa Eulalia of Barcelona, a saint of Catalan origin. The church was thoroughly rebuilt starting from 1630. Some of the construction was not completed until the 19th century. In 1714, the church was transferred to don Giuseppe Raimondi, who installed priest from Madonna della Volta alla Conceria. In 1823 an earthquake damaged the bell tower, which was subsequently demolished. After aerial bombardment in 1943 during the Second World War demolished the interior, only the facade remains.

== Description ==
The church has a sober rectangular exterior, recalling an Ancient Roman triumphal arch, and with some similarities to the facade of Santa Maria della Catena by the harbor. It has three stories each vertically delineated with pilasters, with a Corinthian order at the base, and Doric orders above. The three arches which corresponded to the central nave and two flanking aisles have rounded arches in the second story. Above the portal are the remnants of a coat of arms of King Philip IV of Spain, the blazon flanked by the wings of a Hapsburg eagle, and below, a rhombus with the ensign of the County of Barcelona; these are flanked by four columns symbolizing the Pillars of Hercules swathed with a ribbon that should read plus ultra. Finally, the upper order has four garlands with busts of either Kings of Aragon or Roman emperors.

The interior layout was that of the Greek Cross plan, with some traces of 17th century frescoes. The octagonal dome is supported by pilasters and four columns built in Hyberian marble.

The high altar was made of polychrome marbles, surmounted by a panel depicting the Creation, with stars, the sun and the moon on a blue background. In the past it had an altarpiece depicting the Holy Trinity by Gaspare Serenario, originally deriving from the church of San Giovanni dei Tartari. The transept chapels once had paintings depicting the Madonna of Monserrate and the Martyrdom of St Eulalia by Gerardo Astorino.

== Sources ==
- Nobile, Marco Rosario; Scaduto, Fulvia (2005–2006). "Architettura e magnificenza nella Palermo del primo Cinquecento: il prospetto denominato di Santa Eulalia dei Catalani". Espacio, Tiempo y Forma. 18–19: 13–32.
