= Albergaria, Palermo =

Historical quarter of the Italian city of Palermo in Sicily

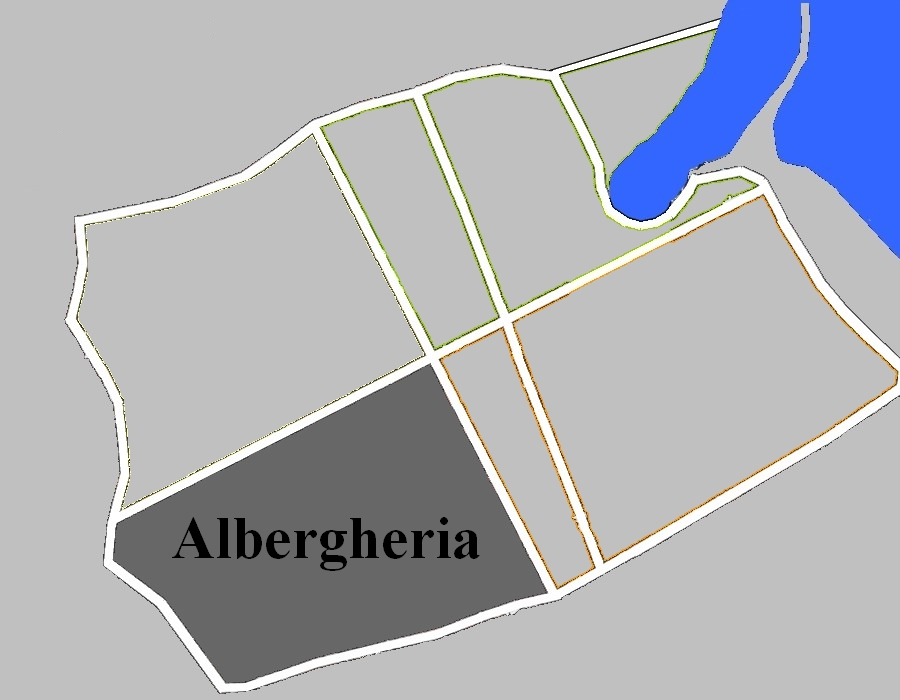

Albergaria or Albergheria, also known as Palazzo Reale, is a historical quarter of the Italian city of Palermo in Sicily.

The district is southwest of Castellammare (or Loggia).
