= Carmine Maggiore, Palermo =

Church in Italy

Church of the Carmine Maggiore
- Chiesa e Convento del Carmine Maggiore
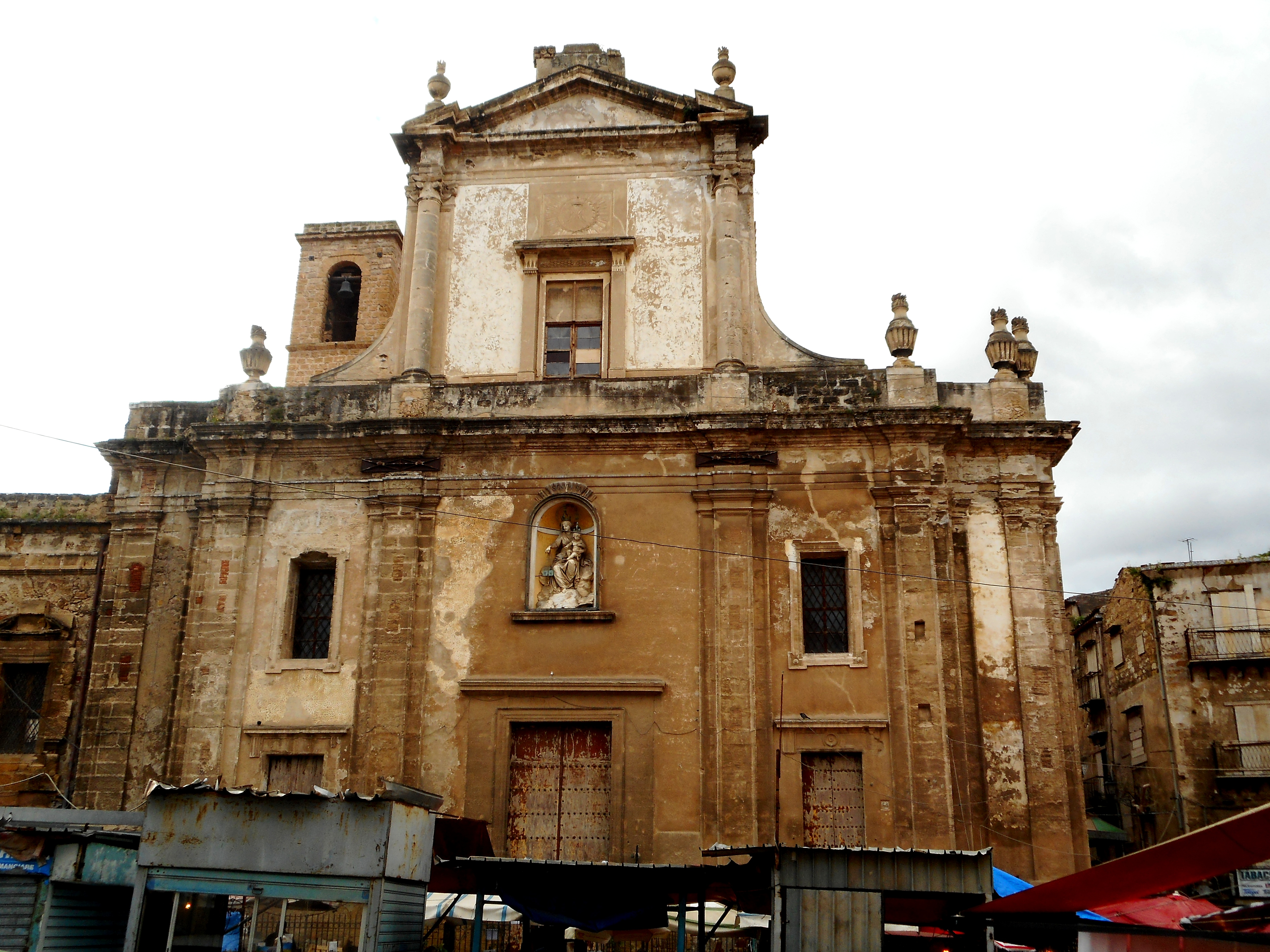

Religion
- Affiliation: Roman Catholic
- Province: Archdiocese of Palermo
- Rite: Roman Rite

Location
- Location: Palermo, Italy
- Interactive map of Church of the Carmine Maggiore
- Coordinates: 38.11130°N 13.36155°E

The church of the Carmine Maggiore is a Roman Catholic church located on Piazza Carmine in front of an open market in the city of Palermo, region of Sicily, Italy.

== History ==
A church at this site appears to date to the 13th-century with the arrival of monks from the Carmelite order, who had left the Holy Land circa 1235. A church at the site was rebuilt over the centuries. Gothic tracery in one of the chapels likely derives from an earlier church. The facade and present structure derives from a construction that took place from 1627 to 1693.

The layout is that of a Latin cross with a central nave and two aisles. The nave is flanked by 12 columns made from stone from Billiemi. The ceiling was frescoed by Giovanni Patricolo. The dome was designed by Angelo Italia

Niches on the pilasters of the dome hold four statues by Vincenzo Messina: St Elias, John the Baptist, Jonah, and Moses. The exterior of the dome, tiled with maiolica is supported on the outside by telamons. The chapel of the Madonna del Carmine was stuccoed by Giacomo Serpotta.
