= Castellammare, Palermo =

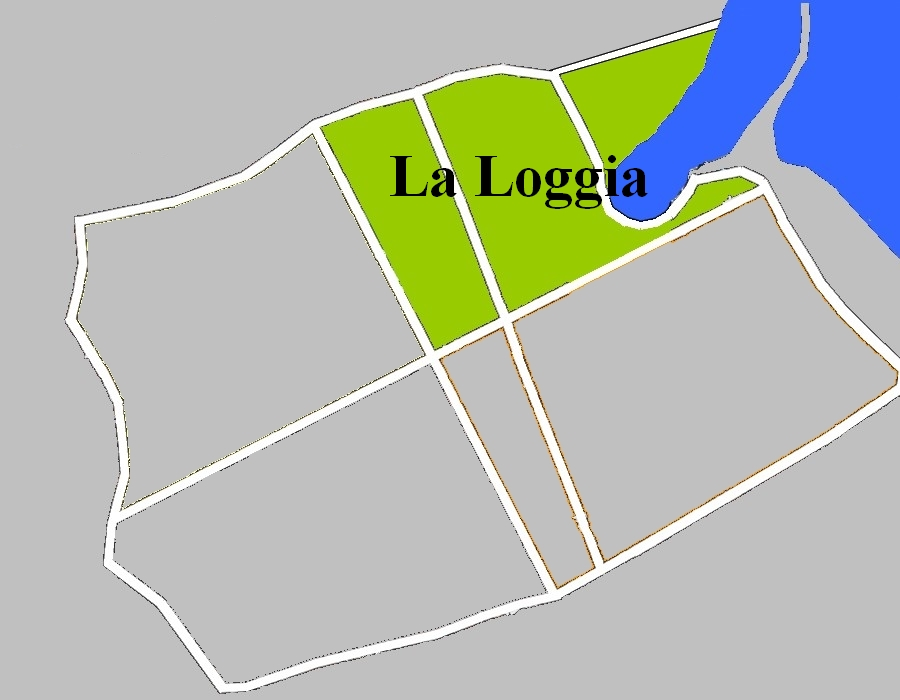

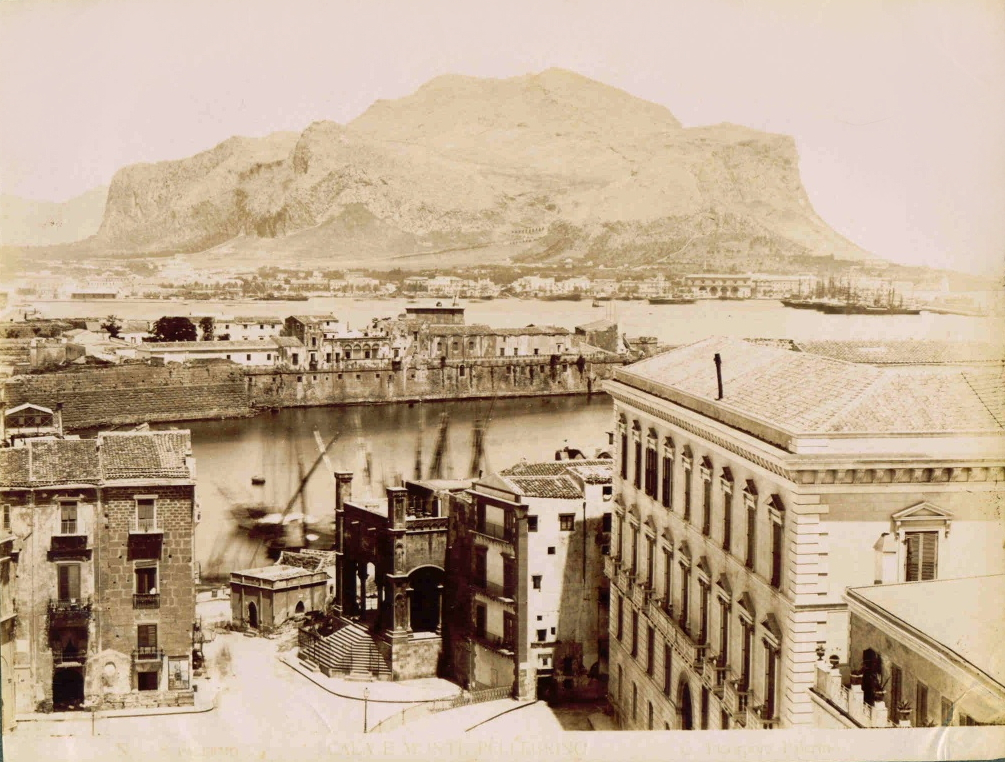

Castellammare (pronounced [kaˌstɛllamˈmaːre]), also called La Loggia (pronounced [la ˈlɔddʒa]), is one of the original quarters of Palermo, region of Sicily, Italy.

The four original districts or mandamenti were established during the Spanish rule of Palermo. La Loggia or Mandamento Castellammare had as a patron Sant'Oliva and its coat of arms matched that of the Royal House of Austria.

The polygonal district is historically delimited by Via Maqueda; Corso Vittorio Emanuele; Via Cavour; and Via Crispi. It contains the Vucciria marketplace and the fortress of Castello a Mare, as well as the church of Santa Sofia dei Tavernieri.
