= Santissimo Salvatore, Alcamo =

Catholic church in Trapani, Italy

Santissimo Salvatore
- Chiesa del Santissimo Salvatore
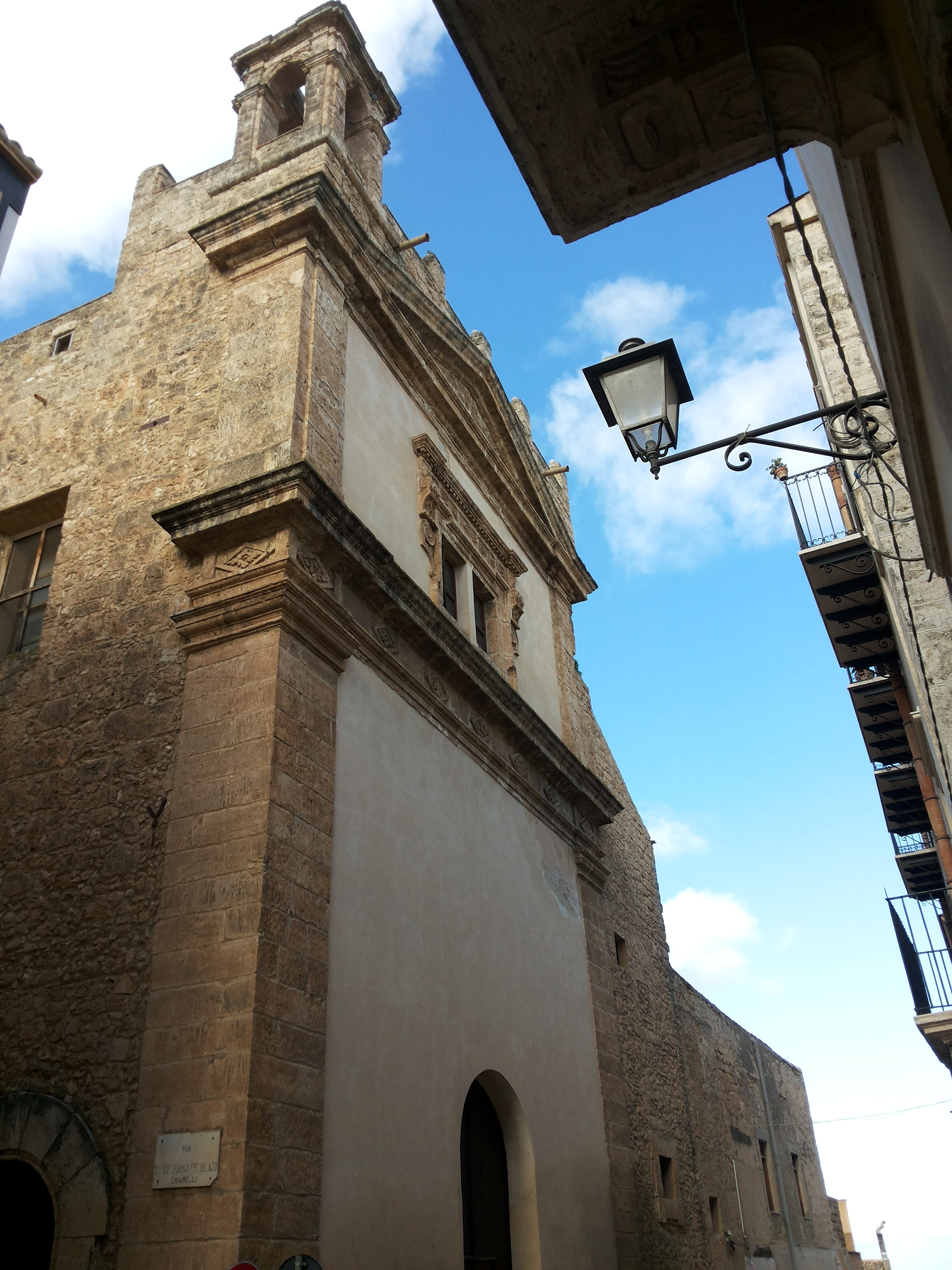
- The façade

Religion
- Affiliation: Benedictine
- Province: Trapani
- Region: Sicily
- Rite: Catholic
- Patron: the Holy Saviour

Location
- Location: Alcamo, province of Trapani, Italy
- Municipality: Alcamo
- State: Italy
- Interactive map of Santissimo Salvatore
- Territory: Alcamo
- Coordinates: 37°58′55″N 12°58′00″E

Architecture
- Completed: 14th century

Santissimo Salvatore ("Holy Saviour", or Badia Grande) is a Catholic church located in Alcamo, in the province of Trapani.

== Description ==
This church, adjoining the nunnery of Badia Grande (today a grammar school) was already existing in 1300, it was rebuilt then in the middle of the 16th century and in the years 1690–97. it was restored in 1737 and embellished with stuccoes. Very interesting are the classical façade, with portals in the windows, and its square bell-tower, with four pointed arches.

The church was closed for several years because of the damages suffered during the 1968 Belice earthquake. Until some years ago, every Wednesday evening they celebrated the Holy Mass in Latin, accompanied by the Gregorian chant and polyphonic ones of the del choir Jacopone da Todi. Inside the Church there are cultural activities connected with the sacred chants, the old one in particular, thanks to the same choir that uses this building on Sunday afternoon and on Wednesday evening.

=== Works ===
The church has one nave with a barrel vault and five altars. Inside it there are beautiful works of great artistic value, among which ten stucco statues:

- Two great angels in the presbitery and eight allegorical statues on the walls (Religion, Faith, Patience, Renounce to World, Vigilance, Happiness, Charity and Hope) made by Serpotta's pupil, Bartolomeo Sanseverino (1758).
- The Transfiguration of Jesus (1759–60), a painting on the high altar
- saint Benedict among a group of saints, a fresco on the vault by Carlo Brunetti
- the sacrificial Lamb among Angels, a fresco on the vault by Carlo Brunetti
- Saint Benedict of Nursia, a marble statue realized by Antonino Gagini (1545)
- The Ecstasy of Saint Teresa, assigned to Pietro Novelli, on the first right altar
- The Assumption of Mary, assigned to Pietro Novelli, on the first left altar
- The Annunciation: oval paintings by Baldassare Massa

In 1982 the ovals of the Annunciation were stolen, together with the high reliefs of saint Michael the Archangel and with saint John Baptist, one of them was bought again at Sotheby's auction in 1994 for 25 million liras.

=== The Tabernacle ===
The marble tabernacle, in high relief and about four metres high, was made by Antonino Gagini and Baldassare Massa (1557–1558). The ciborium, among for kneeling angels, is surmounted by a Crucifix above the figures of saint John the Apostle, the Virgin Mary and the Holy Ghost as a dove and among four angels’ heads:[5] there are also the scene of the Flagellation and the figure of saint John Baptist with Jesus’baptism, saint Michael the Archangel while defeating Satan, the chasing away of the rebel angels into hell, and finally the coat of arms of Alcamo and of the abbess Margherita di Montesa.

She made Baldassare Massa (a sculptor from Palermo) complete the work started by Gagini and inserted seven scenes of the Passion of Jesus, two oval paintings representing saint Benedict and the Redeemer, and a depiction of God the Father with his open arms. The marble tabernacle of the Holy Sacrament was later gilded by Giovan Leonardo Bagolino, a painter from Verona and Sebastiano Bagolino’s father.

== Nunnery ==
The sisters of the nunnery came from noble families; besides religious practices, they created works of sacred handicraft such as plastic polish and ceroplastics, and probably vestments. To avoid the suppression of the convent, owing to the 1866 Laws, they opened a school from 1862 onwards; in fact the sisters administrated a College for Civil Damsels with three classes working inside it; besides reading and writing correctly, they devoted themselves to embroidery, the study of arithmetics, geography and Italian. In the final year they studied history, music and French; the boarding fee also included books, equipment and any medical care.

The convent was suppressed in 1906: the remaining nuns were moved to the nunnery of Badia Nuova, and the premises were first used as barracks, then as schools (primary, nursery and training school). Today they are utilised by the secondary school "Pietro Maria Rocca".

== See also ==
- Giacomo Serpotta
- Pietro Novelli
- Badia Nuova
- Chiesa dei santi Cosma e Damiano (Alcamo)
- Chiesa del santo Angelo Custode

== Sources ==
- Carlo Cataldo: Guida storico-artistica dei beni culturali di Alcamo-Calatafimi-Castellammare Golfo p. 43–44; Sarograf, Alcamo,1982
- Gianni Guadalupi, Mariano Coppola: Alcamo, introduzione di Vincenzo Regina(collana Grand Tour); Grafiche Mazzucchelli, Milano,1995
- Carlo Cataldo: La conchiglia di S.Giacomo p. 226; ed.Campo, Alcamo, 2001
