= Oratorio di Santa Caterina, Palermo =

Oratory in Palermo, Italy

Oratorio di Santa Caterina d'Alessandria
- Oratorio di San Caterina
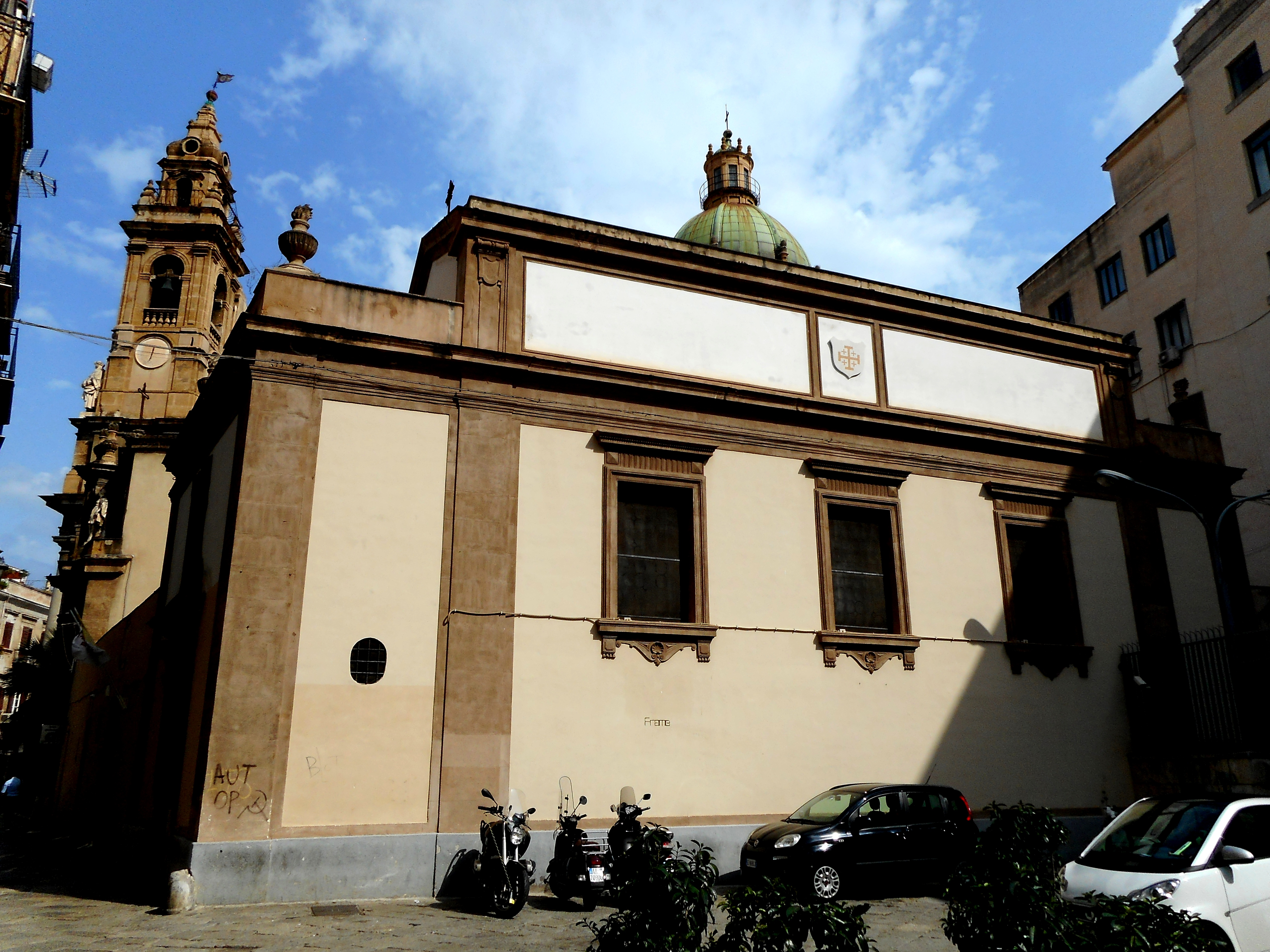

Religion
- Affiliation: Roman Catholic
- Province: Archdiocese of Palermo
- Rite: Roman Rite

Location
- Location: Palermo, Italy
- Interactive map of Oratorio di Santa Caterina d'Alessandria
- Coordinates: 38.12037°N 13.36044°E

Architecture
- Style: Sicilian Baroque
- Groundbreaking: 1726

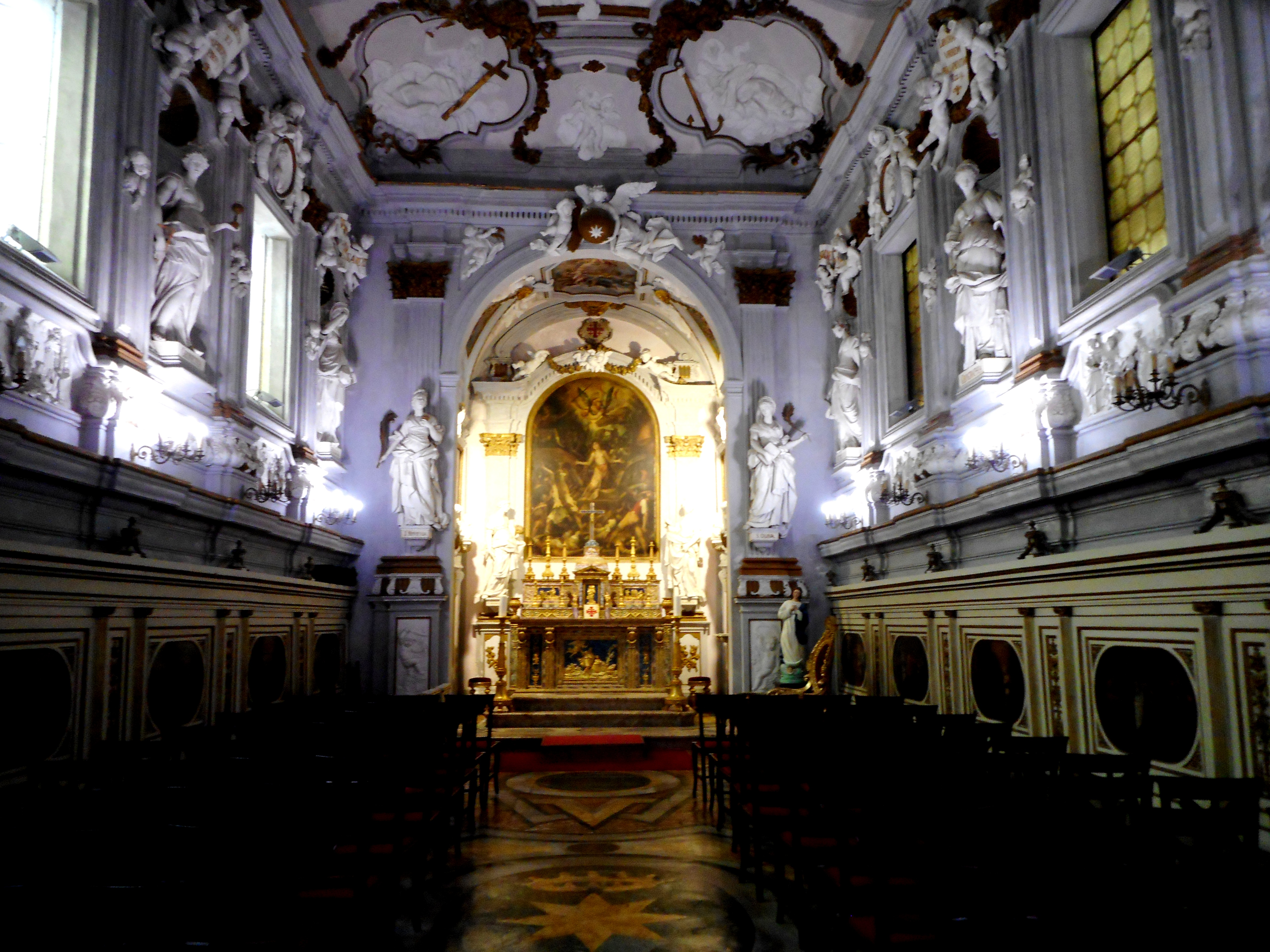
Interior towards the main altar

The Oratory of Saint Catherine of Alexandria (Italian: Oratorio di Santa Caterina d'Alessandria) is a Baroque oratory located attached to the church of Sant'Ignazio all'Olivella, in the quarter of the Castellammare of Palermo, region of Sicily, Italy.

This oratory was built in 1726 under the patronage of the Confraternity of Santa Caterina, and supposedly set on the site of the former family home of Santa Rosalia. The interior stucco decoration was completed by Giacomo Serpotta and his son Procopio. In the vestibule is a depiction of The Mystical Marriage of St Catherine by Giuseppe Salerno.

Flanking the entrance are allegorical statues of Knowledge and Science, two areas of study which the Jesuits wished to stress. Along the wall are small stucco dioramas with episodes of the life of St Catherine. The main altarpiece depicts the Martyrdom of St Catherine (1609) also by Salerno. The church also has a Renaissance painting depicting the Madonna and Child by Vincenzo da Pavia. The stalls for the members of the confraternity are also engraved with episodes of the life of St Catherine. Since 1946, the oratory has hosted the Order of the Holy Sepulcher.
