= Sant'Ignazio all'Olivella =

Roman Catholic church in Palermo, Italy

Church of Saint'Ignatius
- Chiesa di Sant'Ignazio all'Olivella (in Italian)
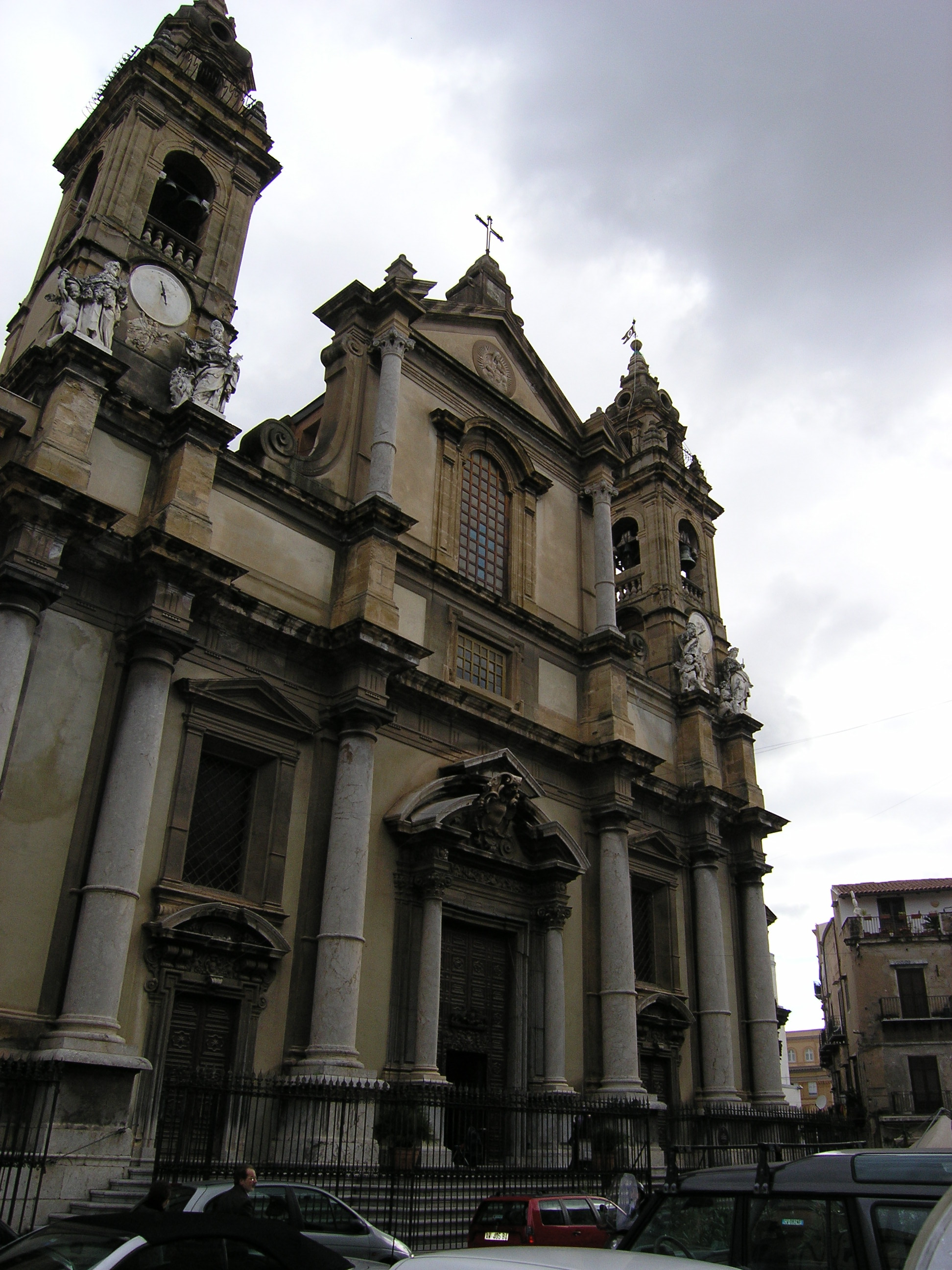
- Façade of the church

Religion
- Affiliation: Roman Catholic
- Province: Archdiocese of Palermo
- Rite: Roman Rite
- Year consecrated: 1711

Location
- Location: Palermo, Italy
- Interactive map of Church of Saint'Ignatius
- Coordinates: 38°07′14.34″N 13°21′38.63″E

Architecture
- Architect: Antonio Muttone
- Style: Baroque
- Groundbreaking: 1598
- Completed: 1622

The Church of Saint Ignatius (Italian: Chiesa di Sant'Ignazio or Sant'Ignazio all'Olivella) is a Baroque church of Palermo. It is located in the ancient neighborhood of the Olivella, in the quarter of the Loggia, within the historic centre of Palermo.

== History ==
Construction of the church was begun in 1598 under the patronage the Congregation of the Oratory of Saint Philip Neri. Putatively, this site housed the Sinibaldi family palace, where the 12th-century Santa Rosalia had been born. A Norman era chapel was present at the site. The Oratory of Santa Caterina is present to the right of the facade, recessed from the piazza. North of the facade is attached the former convent of the Jesuit congregation, now Regional Archeological Museum Antonio Salinas. The initial architect was Antonio Muttone. Work persisted for nearly a century, and formal consecration did not take place till 1711.

== Description ==
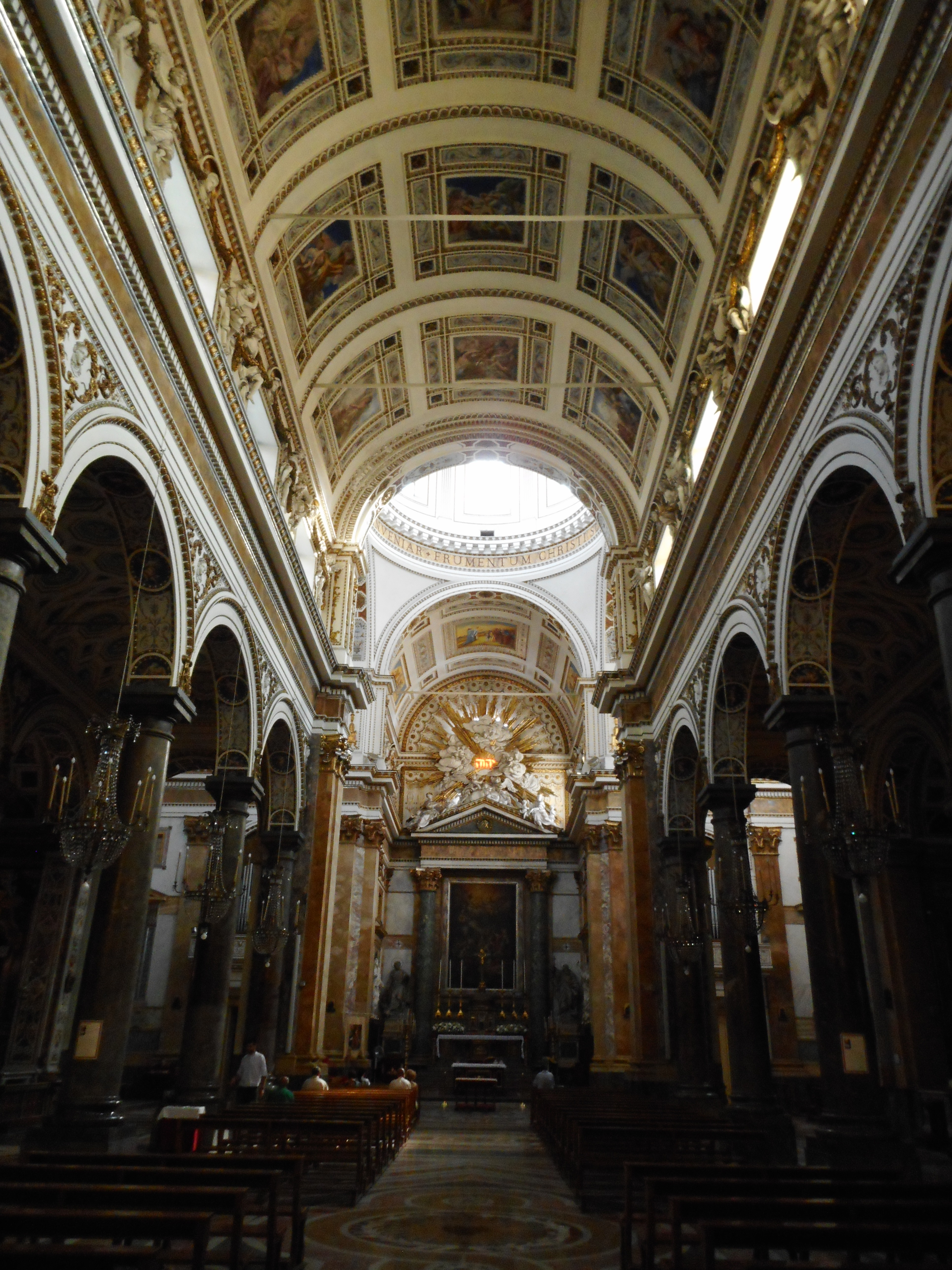
Interior towards apse with frescoed panels on ceiling

The baroque facade has projecting doric columns. The flanking bell-towers were added in the 18th century, and embellished with statues depicting Saints Phillip Neri, Rosalia (added in 1651), Ignatius of Antioch (holding the palm-frond of martyrdom and menaced by a lion at his feet) and Francis of Sales (added 1751).

The dome was completed in 1732. The ceiling decorated with coffered panels, frescoed by Antonio Manno. The floor is paved with polychrome marbles. The main altarpiece depicts a Trinity by Sebastiano Conca. It was flanked by stucco and marble statues on an imposing main altar, including the marble statues of Saints Peter and Paul by Ignazio Marabitti. A lateral altar has a canvas depicting the Martyrdom of St Ignatius by Filippo Paladino. Another altarpiece is a copy of Guido Reni's portrait of St Phillip Neri. A Miracle of the Blessed Sebastian Valfrè was painted by Salvatore Loforte; he also painted the large altarpiece depicting San Nicolo di Bari appears in the clouds of a tempest to the Abbott Elpino. The chapel of St Mary Magdalen has an altarpiece by Mario Menniti. An Annuciation was completed by Giacomo Loverde in imitation of the style of Pietro Novelli. A 15th-century altarpiece depicting the Virgin and Child with a young John the Baptist attributed to Lorenzo di Credi.

== See also ==
- 18th-century Western domes
