= Oratorio di San Mercurio, Palermo =

Prayer room or oratory in Palermo, Italy

Oratory of St Mercurius
- Oratorio di San Mercurio
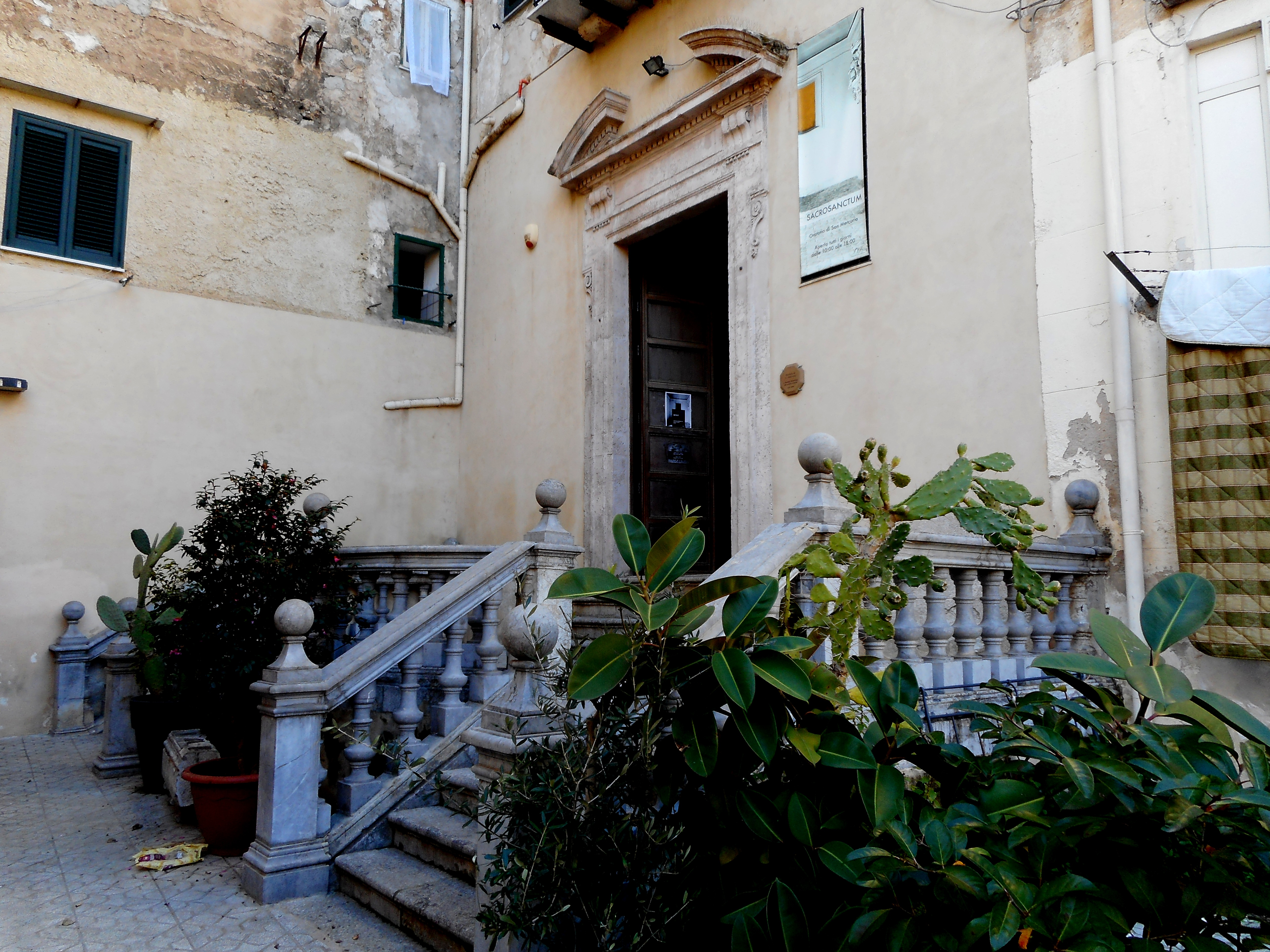
- Exterior staircase and entry in an alley off Via dei Benedictini

Religion
- Affiliation: Roman Catholic
- Province: Archdiocese of Palermo
- Rite: Roman Rite

Location
- Location: Palermo, Italy
- Interactive map of Oratory of St Mercurius
- Coordinates: 38.10978°N 13.35398°E

The Oratorio di San Mercurio is a Baroque prayer room or oratory located adjacent to the former Benedictine convent and church of San Giovanni degli Eremiti, in the quarter of the Albergaria, within the historic centre of Palermo, region of Sicily, Italy.

== History ==
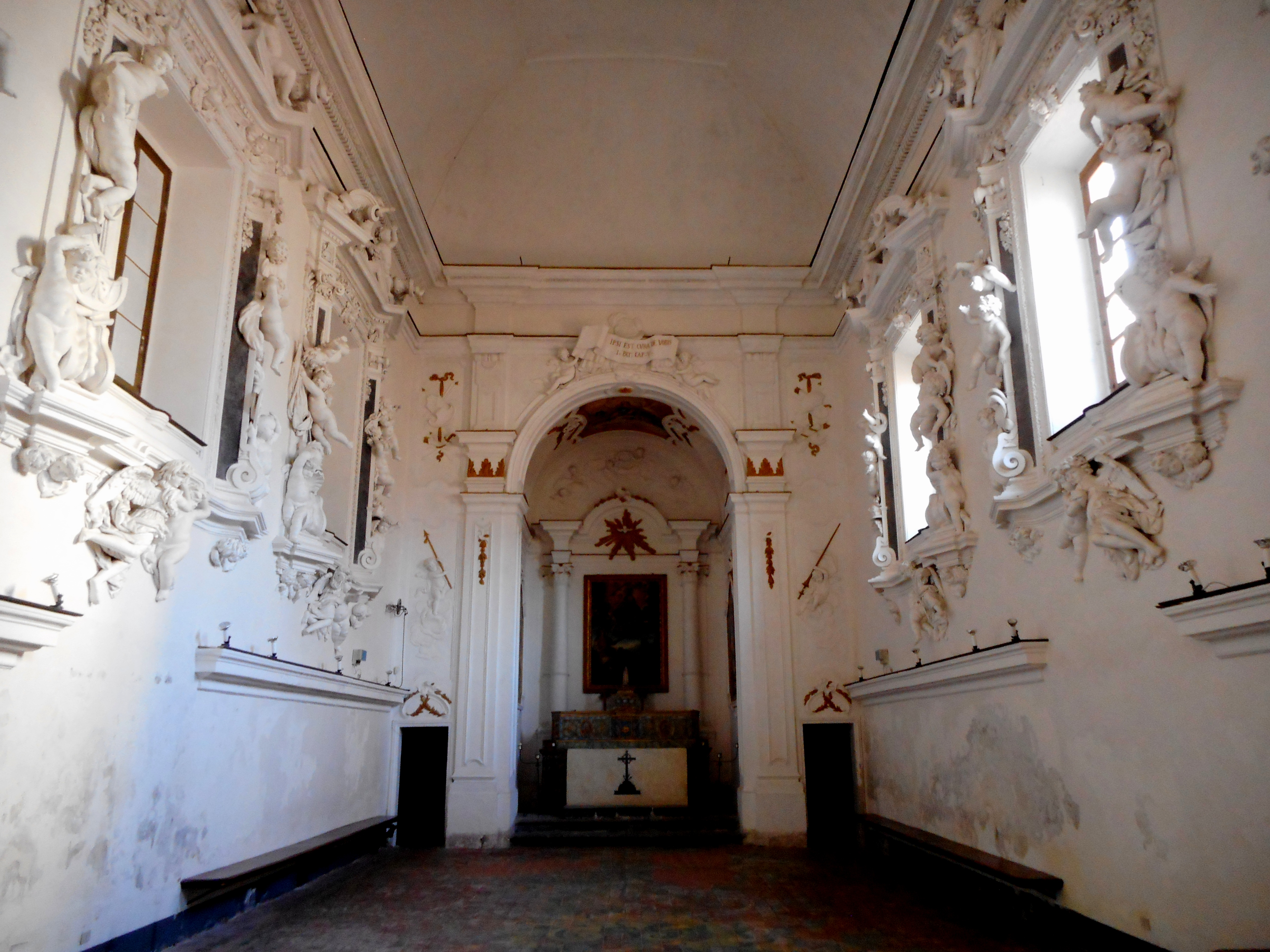
Interior towards main altar

The oratory was founded in 1557 by an aristocratic confraternity known as the Compagnia di Santa Maria della Consolazione. The oratory was initially called Oratorio del Deserto e di San Mercurio. The oratory grew around a venerated Marian image found in a desolate spot outside of the city. The confraternity had charitable goals of aiding the sick in the Ospedale Grande of Palermo. and decorated over the next two centuries with a rich stucco decoration, including statues of saints and beatified members of the Carmelite order. The order was affiliated with a number of churches in Palermo, including the Carmine Maggiore a few blocks away.

The oratory hall is preceded by an elegant staircase built in 1719 and an anteroom with maiolica pavement and a fresco depicting Jesus visits the jailed St Mercurius. The interior of the hall was stuccoed in 1678 by Giacomo Serpotta. The oratory has a choir with an organ; the ceiling was frescoed (and stuccoed) with a Glory of St Mercurius while the main altarpiece is a canvas depicting the Vision of the Madonna and Child by St Mercurius. The maiolica pavement of the main hall was completed in 1714-1715 by Sebastiano Gurrello and Maurizio Vagolotta, based on a design by the architect-priest Giulio Di Pasquale.
