= Badia Nuova =

Church building in Alcamo, Italy

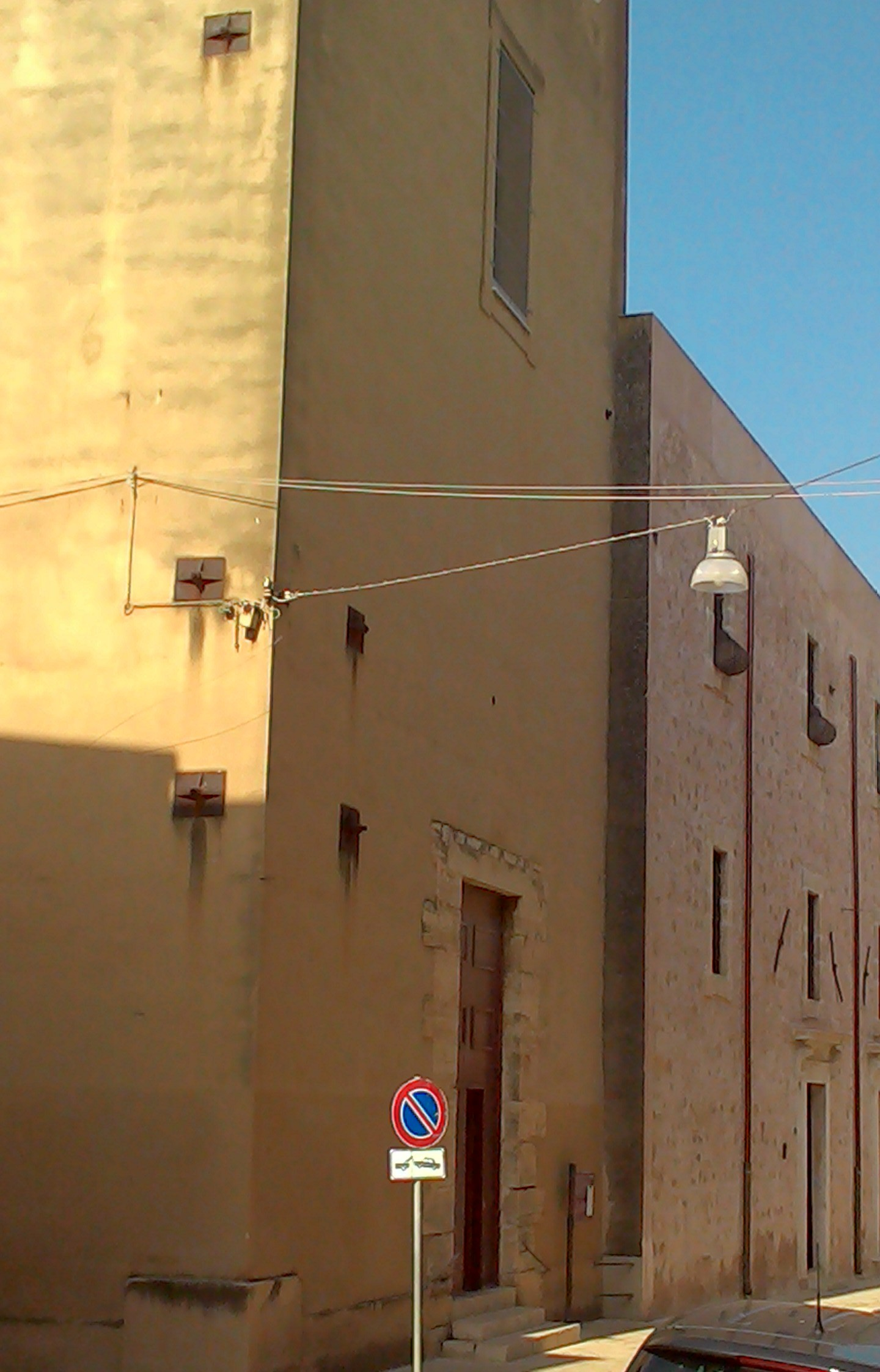
- The façade

Religion
- Affiliation: Benedictine
- Province: province of Trapani
- Region: Sicily
- Rite: Catholic
- Patron: saint Francis of Paola

Location
- Location: Alcamo, province of Trapani, Italy
- Municipality: Alcamo
- State: Italy
- Interactive map of Badia Nuova
- Territory: Alcamo
- Coordinates: 37°58′49″N 12°58′06″E

Architecture
- Architect: Giovan Biagio Amico
- Type: baroque
- Founder: Father Filippo Scamacca
- Groundbreaking: 1531

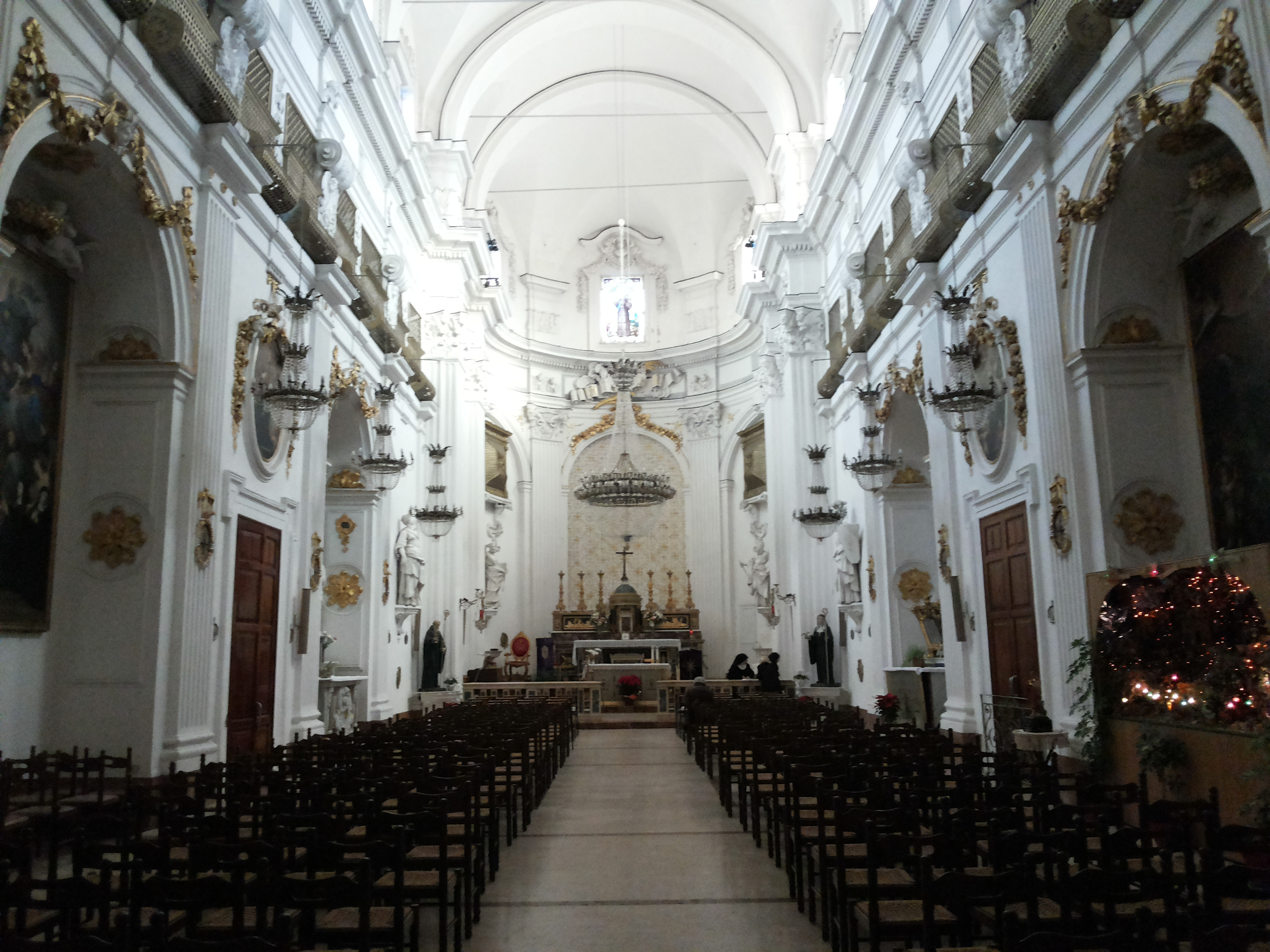
Interior of the church.

Badia Nuova is a Catholic church located in Alcamo, in the province of Trapani, Sicily, southern Italy.

Adjoining the church there is the convent of Saint Francis of Paola.

== History ==
The church was founded in 1531 by Father Filippo Scamacca, while the convent of Saint Francis of Paola was built some decades later. In 1699 it was pulled down and enlarged with the construction of a new building and some gardens in the first half of the 18th century (1724), under the direction of Giovanni Biagio Amico, an architect from Trapani. Finally in 1968 it was restored because of the Belice Valley earthquake.

The convent was suppressed in 1866, opened again, and entirely restored in the subsequent decades.

== Description ==
The church plan is with one nave and a barrel vault with simple pillars, four side altars, and is embellished by a sober stucco decoration.

=== The convent of saint Francis of Paola ===
In 1567 Sister Margherita Montesa, together with four sisters, moved here from the convent of Santissimo Salvatore and became the first abbess. Owing to the 1866 Laws, the nunnery had to leave the western wing of the building to a Technica School, later to a lower Vocational School and then to an elementary school; today these premises are used by some associations.

The nuns, faithful to the charisma "ora et labora", live by praying and working; during the day they devote themselves to look after the kitchen garden and other works in the "convent workshops" such as:

- sewing
- knitting
- embroideries
- holy objects repairing
- preparation of the famous sweets candied with pumpkin and figs on holidays
- small wreaths with petals enamelled with starch.
- wine from their own vineyards.

Many years ago the nuns attended Mass behind their high grids, today every morning they are inside the church to hear Mass. Besides they are daily engaged with the Liturgy of the Hours and Lectio Divina, which believers can take part in on request.

=== Works ===
Inside the Church there are some 18th-century paintings and statues:

- Saint Benedict from Norcia (on the first left altar): a wonderful canvas by Pietro Novelli with the Holy Trinity on the top, some Angels below it, and Saint Benedict in the middle while giving the rules of the Benedictine Order. Saint Placido is the gentleman on the left with a cane, next to him the Knights of Alcantara, and the Benedictine nuns on the right; below, on the left border, there is a self-portrait of Pietro Novelli (kneeling and with a large mantle) with a beard and a mustache.
- the wooden Crucifix (second left altar): assigned to fra Benedetto Valenza from Trapani (1700), at his feet, there are two statues made by Giacomo Serpotta: Mary Magdalen and Our Lady of Sorrows
- Saint San Francis of Paola, a painting made by Andrea Carrera in 1652 (first right altar).
- Our Lady with Angels (Madonna degli Angeli) painted by Giuseppe Sirena (1500), second right altar.
- Saint Gregory the Great, above the left portal
- Cunigunde of Luxembourg, above the right portal
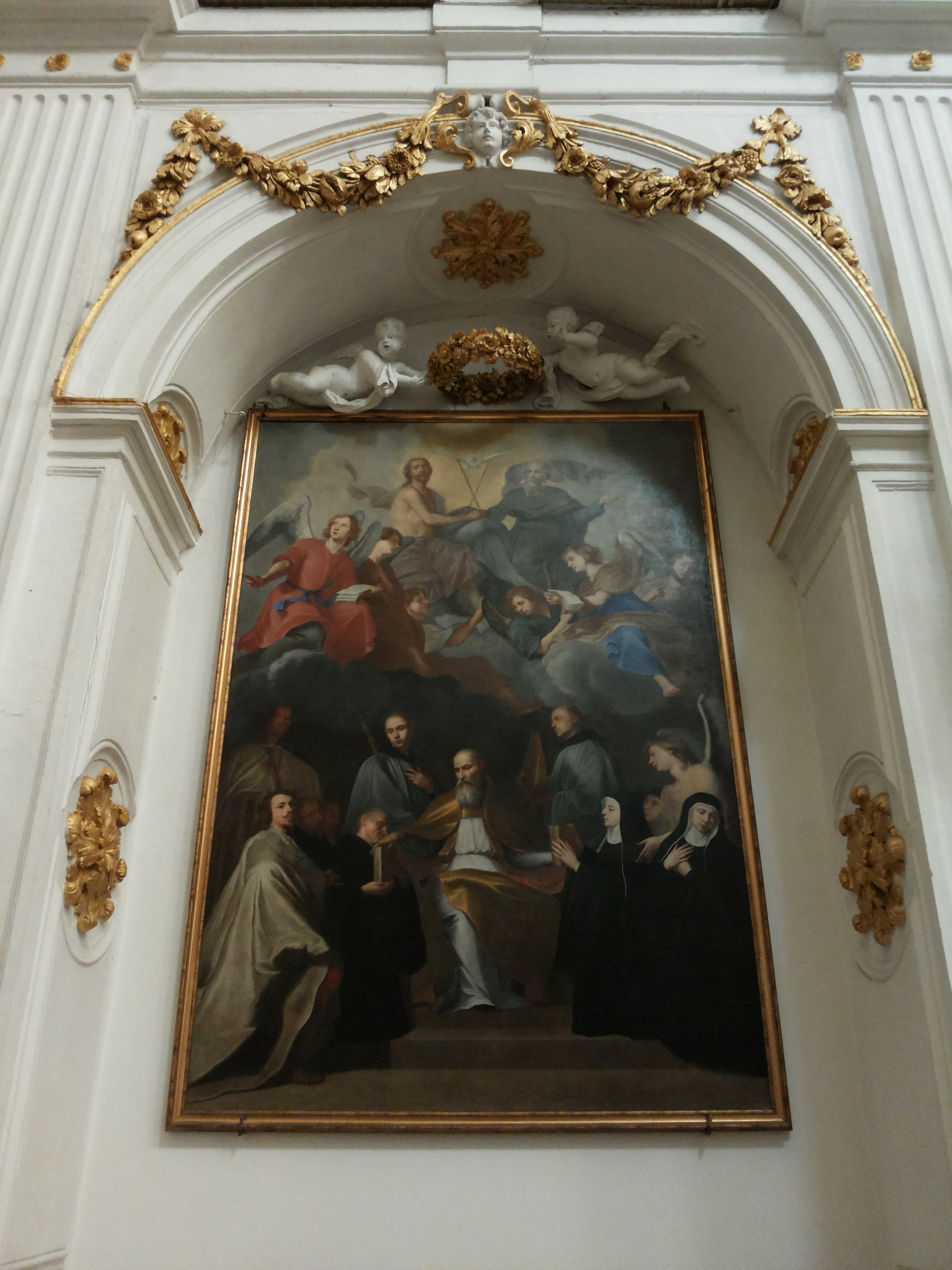
Saint Benedict giving the Rule.

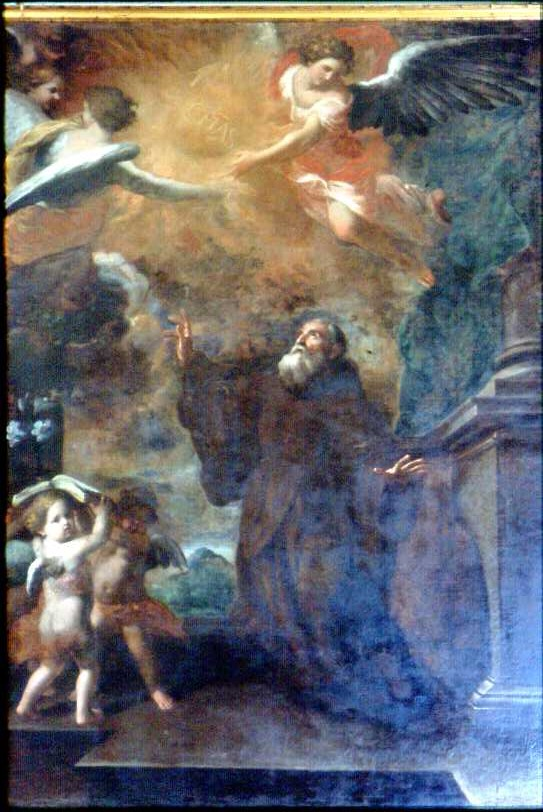
Painting of Saint Francis of Paola

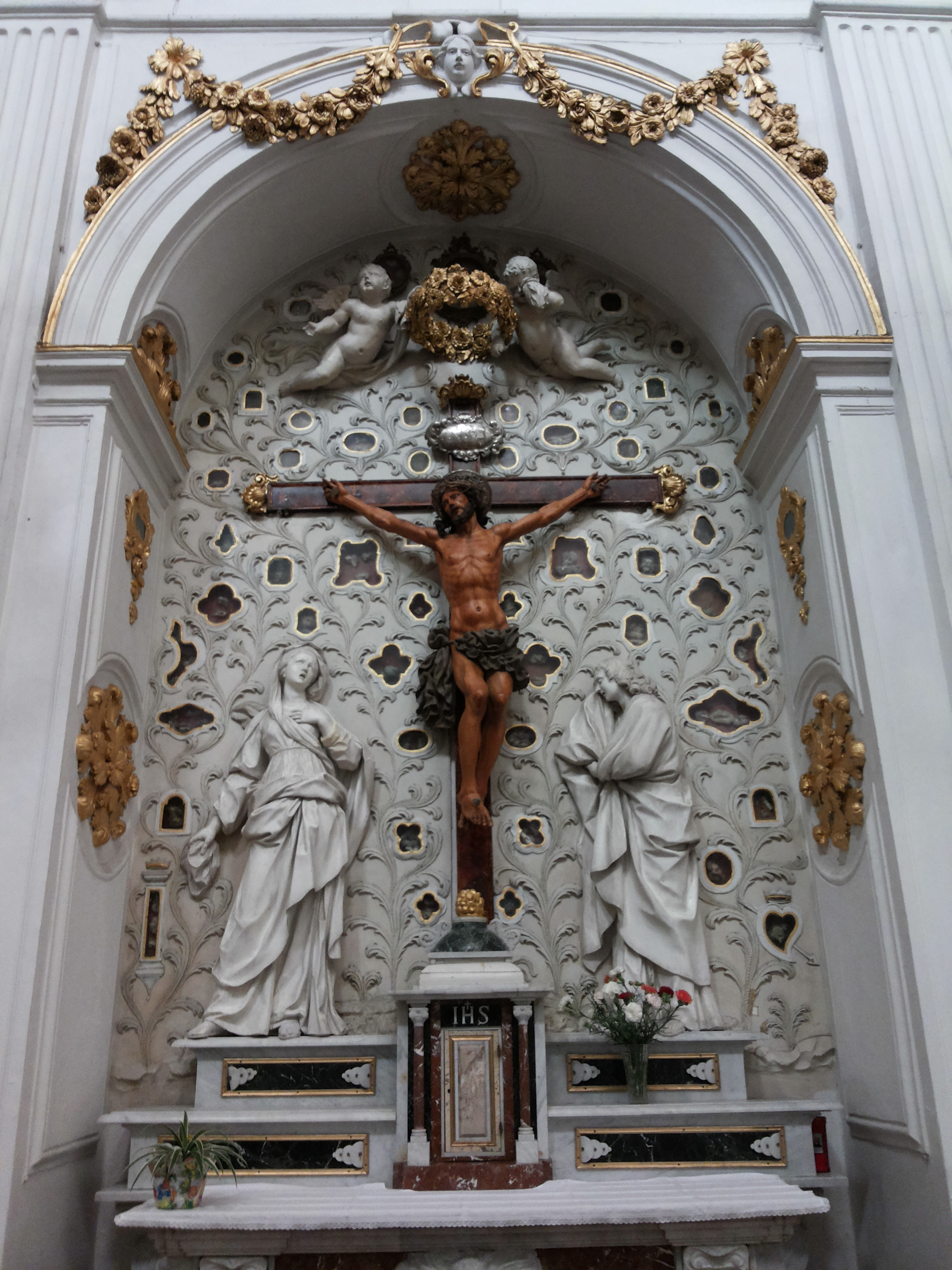
The Crucifix

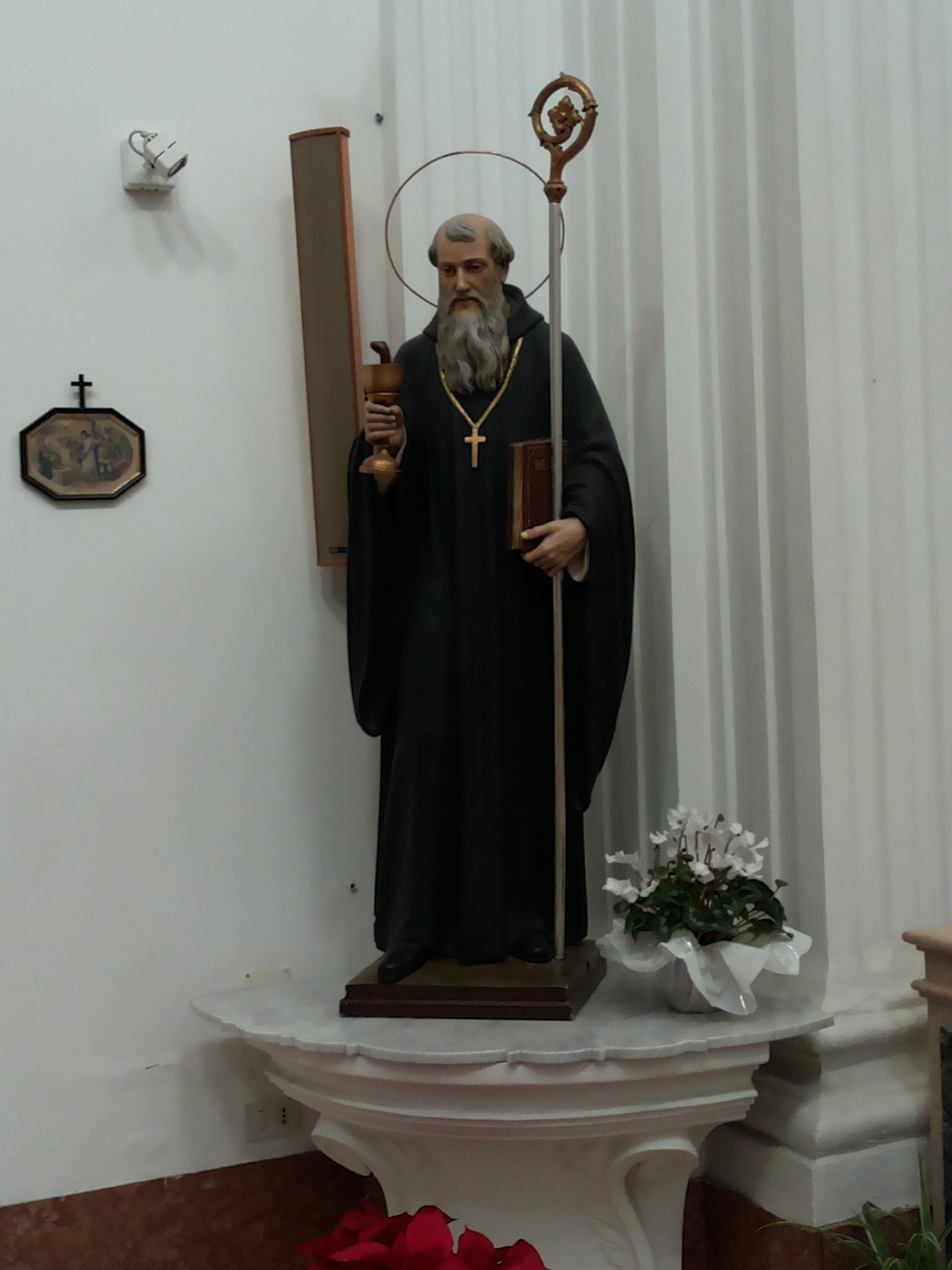
Statue of Saint Benedict

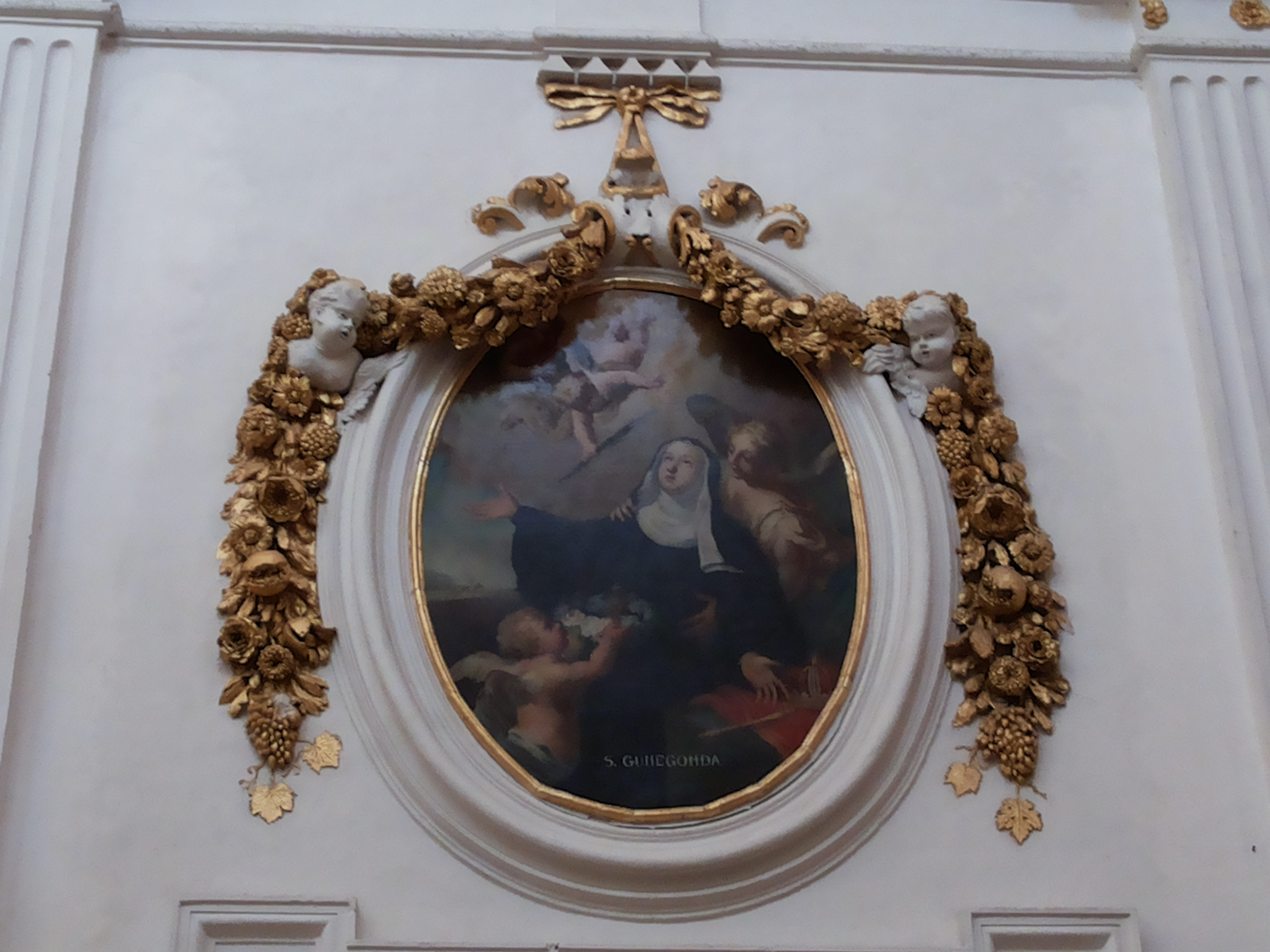
Painting with saint Cunigunde

Besides them, the high altar is embellished by two wonderful antependiums, embroidered with golden and silver threads by the Benedictine nuns in 1800. In the nunnery there are also: a wooden statue of saint Martha dating back to the 17th century, a painting of Our Lady of Miracles by Giuseppe Renda, and a wonderful wooden tabernacle.

=== Statues by Serpotta ===
In the Church there are eight beautiful and elegant stucco statues, called allegorical, realized in 1724 by Giacomo Serpotta in the last period of his activity. They are among the artist's most important masterpieces and are very close to Bernini's work for their expressive energy. Six statues are located along the walls, on half-height protruding brackets, while two of them, Our lady of Sorrows and Mary Magdalen, adorn the chapel of the Crucifix and are placed on the two sides of the Cross, forming a type of theatrical scene of extraordinary drama. This is one of the characteristics of Serpotta, also visible in many other masterpieces made by him.

The statues are the following:

- Peace: represented by a man with a draped suit, leaning on a cane with his right hand, while keeping an olive branch, symbol of peace, with his left hand.
- Fortitude: depicted by a woman with an armor, helmet, spear and a shield kept with the left hand; a very fine statue.
- Meekness: with a full dress and a diadem on her head, keeping a lamb, symbol of innocence, with her right hand.
- Purity is represented by a noblewoman, with a richly draped dress, with a beautiful dove (symbol of purity) on her right hand.
- Saint Peter is depicted with the Holy Bible and the keys in his left hand; the right one points out to heaven.
- Saint Paul, instead, is represented in the traditional way with a sword in the right hand and the Holy Bible in the left one. For Saint Paul, the Word of God is alive, effective, and sharper than any other edged weapon.
- Mary Magdalen (in the chapel of the Crucifix, second left altar): in a large mantle, her right hand raised towards the right eye wiping her tears.
- Our Lady of Sorrows: in a large mantle too, tightening a strip of it with her right hand. The left hand is close to her chest, her head slightly bent down, her eyes in tears, and the mouth sobbing.
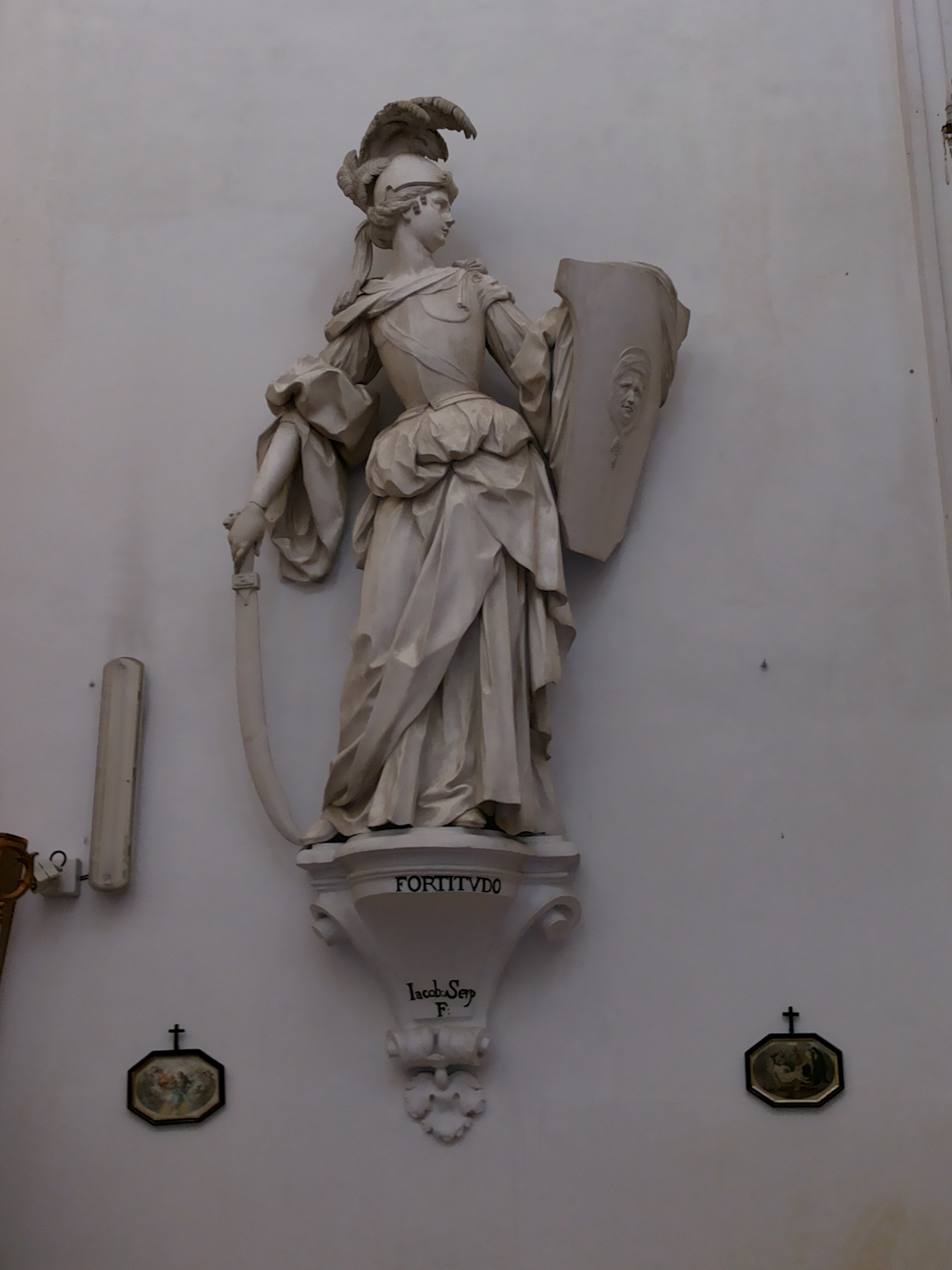
Fortitude

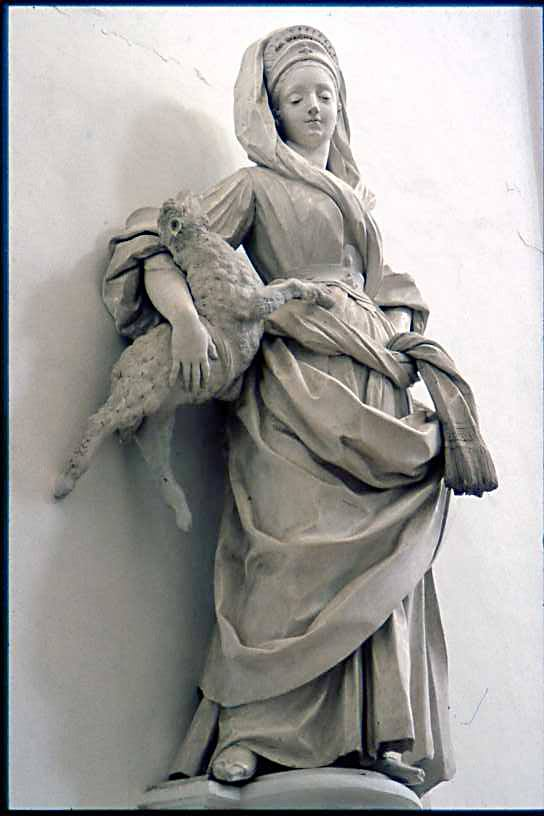
Meekness

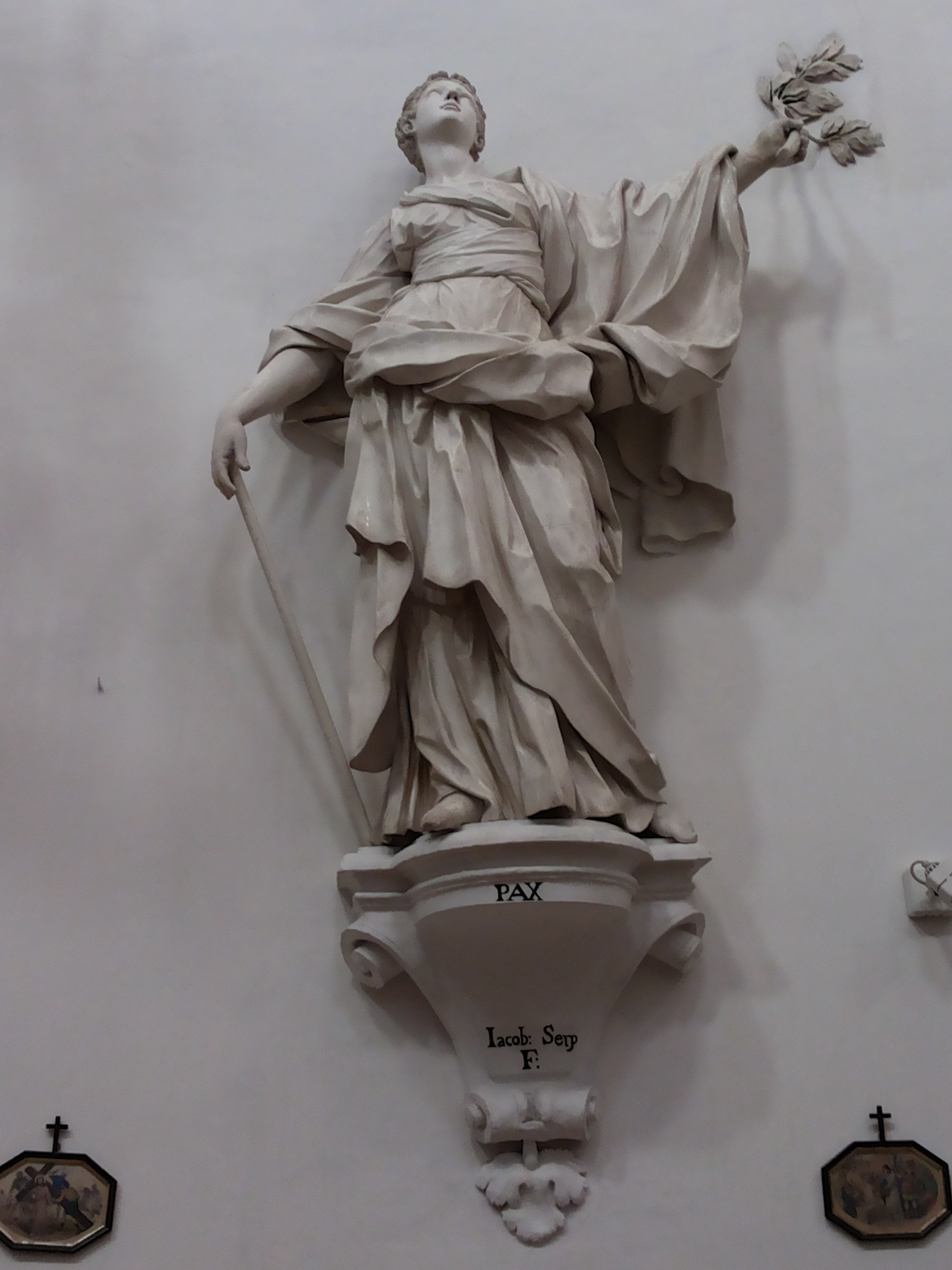
Peace

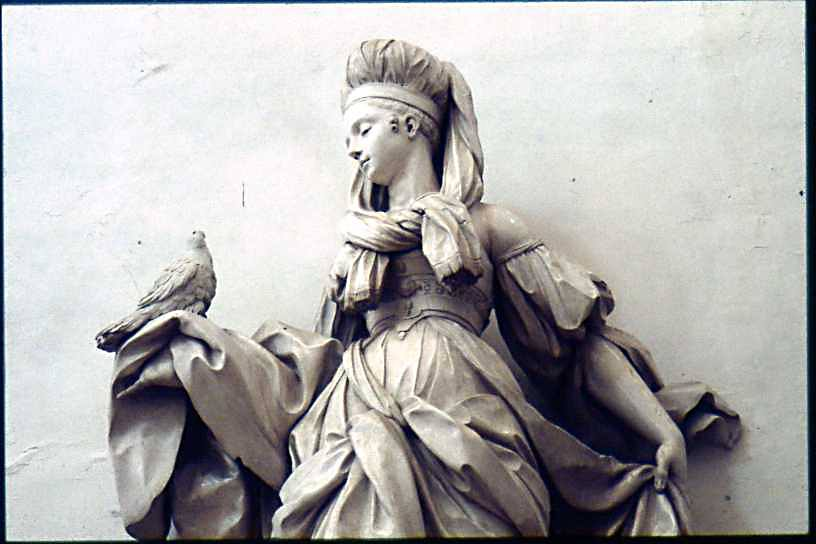
Purity

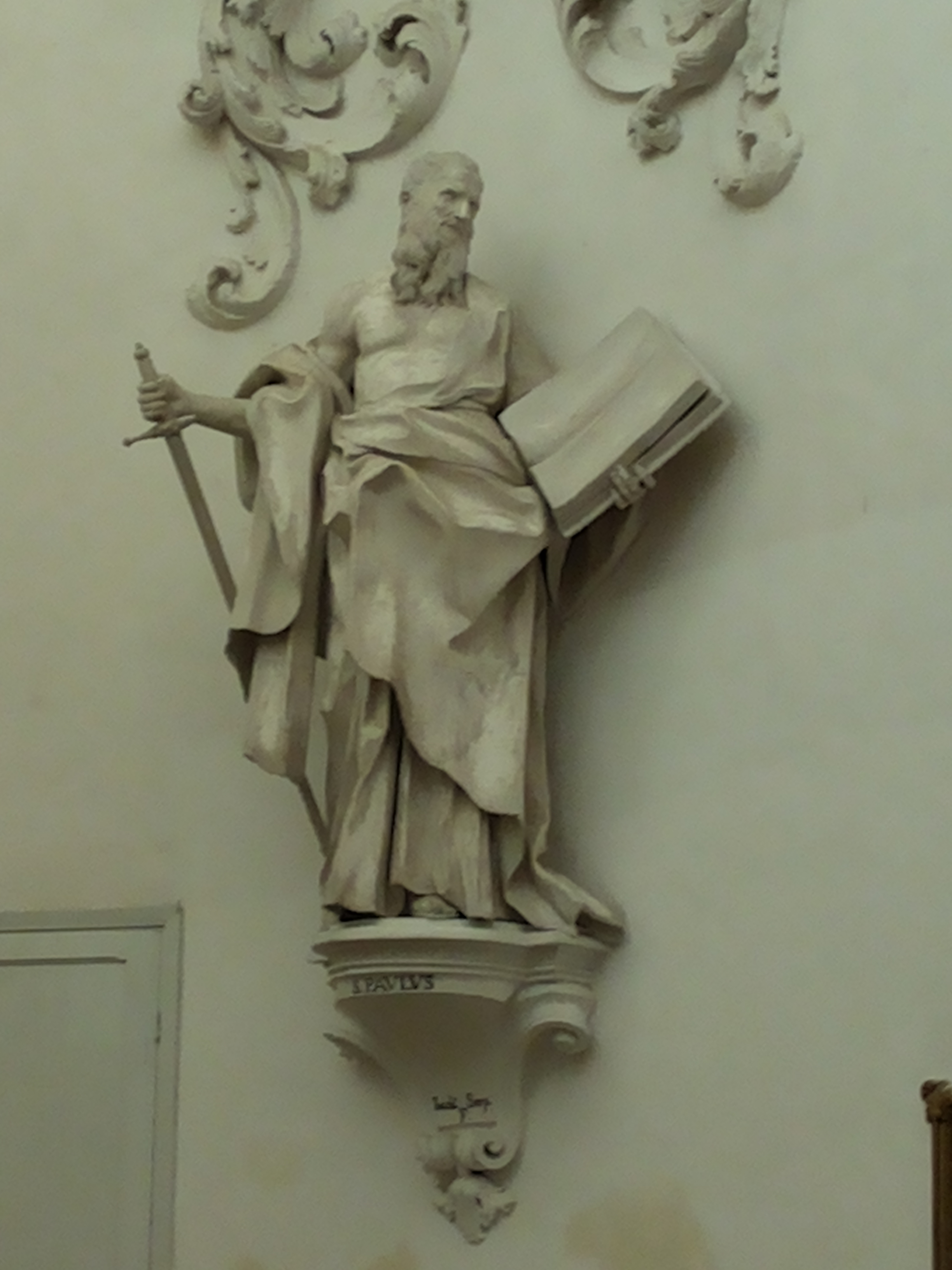
Saint Paul

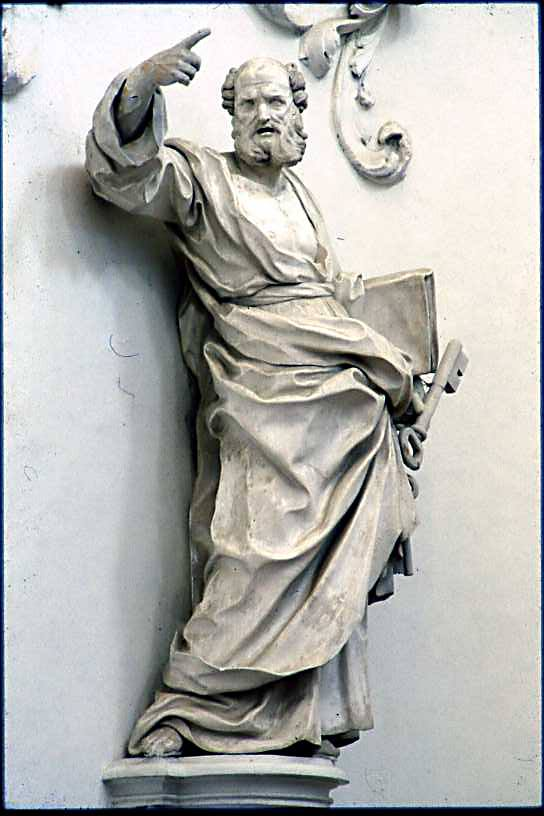
Saint Peter

These stuccoes, of great artistic interest, have an unconsumed patina which has disappeared in many others, that is the allustratura which gives makes them look like wonderful alabasters.

== Sources ==
- Giacobelli, Chiara (2012). 1001 monasteri e santuari in Italia da visitare almeno una volta nella vita. Roma: Newton Compton editori. ISBN 978-88-541-5227-4.
- Favara, Giuseppina; Eliana Mdate (2009). Giacomo Serpotta e la sua scuola in: itinerari dei beni culturali. Palermo: Grafill. ISBN 978-88-8207-321-3.
- Collura, Matteo (2008). Sicilia sconosciuta, 365 pagine. Milano: Rizzoli.
- Milanesi, Luigi (17 October 2015). Dizionario Etimologico della Lingua Siciliana 1820 pagine. Mnamon.
- Bambina, Maurizio. Alcamo, tra arte e cultura. Alcamo: Lions Club.
- Gallo, Agostino (1821). Elogio storico di Antonio Gagini, scultore ed architetto palermitano. Palermo: Reale stamperia.
- Chiara Giacobelli (4 February 2013). 1001 monasteri e santuari in Italia da visitare almeno una volta nella vita. Newton Compton Editori. p. 699. ISBN 978-88-541-5227-4.
- Cataldo, Carlo (2001). La conchiglia di S.Giacomo p.226. Alcamo: Campo.
- Cataldo, Carlo (1982). Guida storico-artistica dei Beni Culturali di Alcamo-Calatafimi-Castellammare del Golfo-Salemi-Vita. Alcamo: Sarograf.
