= Santi Cosma e Damiano, Alcamo =

Roman Catholic church in Sicily, Italy

Santi Cosma e Damiano
- Chiesa dei Santi Cosma e Damiano
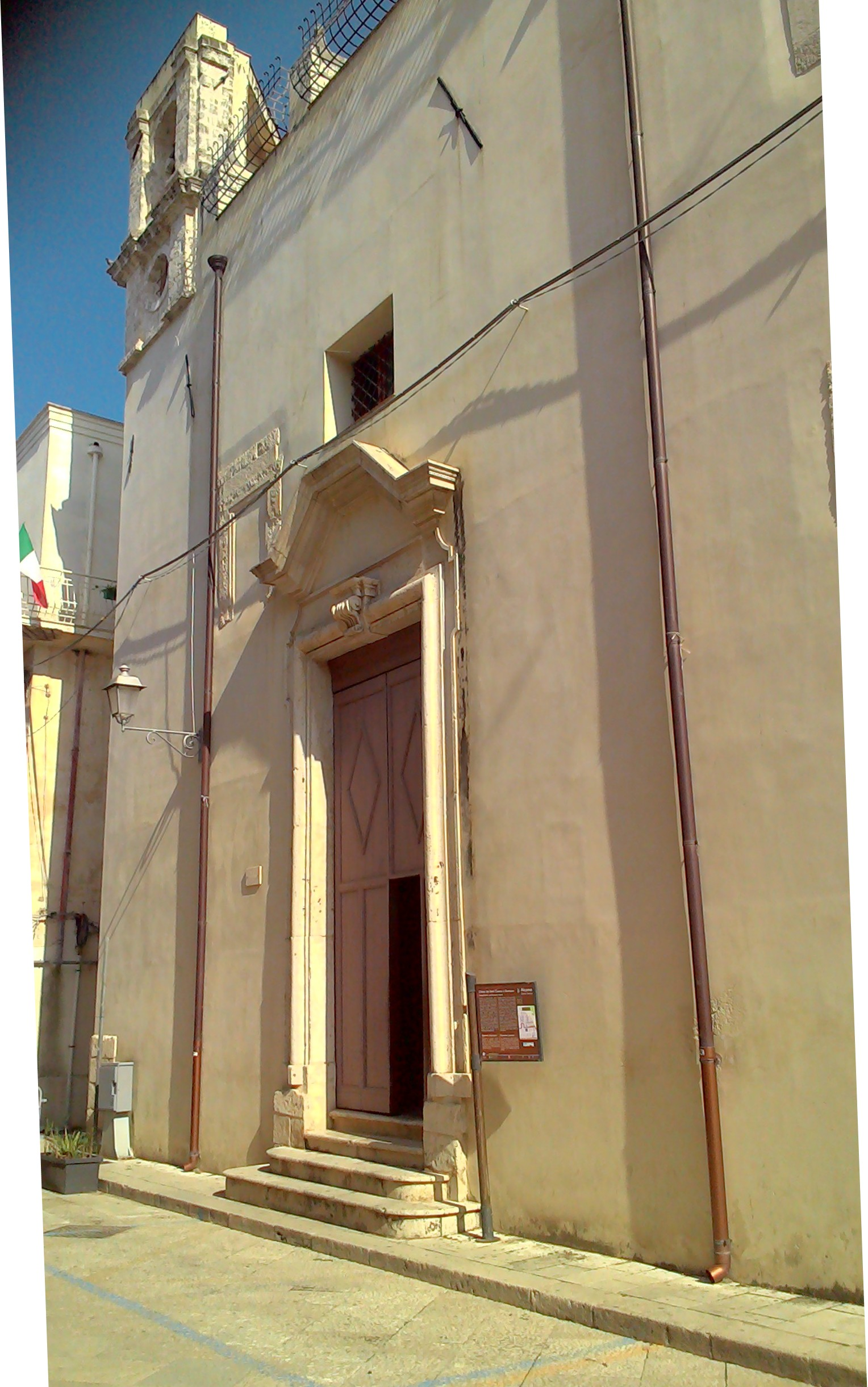
- The façade

Religion
- Affiliation: Clarissas
- Province: Trapani
- Region: Sicily
- Rite: Catholic
- Patron: saints Cosma and Damiano

Location
- Location: Alcamo, Trapani, Italy
- Municipality: Alcamo
- State: Italy
- Interactive map of Santi Cosma e Damiano
- Territory: Alcamo
- Coordinates: 37°58′52″N 12°58′03″E

Architecture
- Architect: Giuseppe Mariani
- Type: baroque
- Groundbreaking: 1500 ca,

Website
- http://www.ofmsicilia.it/s_chiara.htm

Santi Cosma e Damiano (or Santa Chiara) is a Roman Catholic church in Alcamo, in the province of Trapani, Sicily, southern Italy.

This Baroque church was built around 1500 after the plan of Giuseppe Mariani and rebuilt between 1721 and 1725.

== Description ==
The church has one nave and presents a tambour which inside repeats the shape of the main body with a hexagonal plan, while the chapels are delimited by some pillars in Corinthian style. Thanks to its restyling probably inspired by the Roman church of Saint Ives alla Sapienza by the architect Francesco Borromini, it became in 1725 an example of the most beautiful Sicilian baroque.

=== Santa Chiara's nunnery ===
Adjoining the church is Saint Clare's nunnery and it was annexed during the years 1545-1547.

In 1545 three noble sisters (Antonina, Angela and Alberta Mompilieri), together with some devout women founded a convent of Poor Clares and were assigned the adjoining church of the Saints Cosma and Damiano's Church. Owing to the 1866 Laws the western wing of the building was confiscated: there was an elementary school for about a century, in 1958 it was demolished and the central Post Office was built. Some years ago the nuns bought the first floor of this building, thanks to the believers' offerings and some other contributions.

The Clares of this convent, besides taking part in the religious rites in the Church with their chants, have helped in the birth and revival of other nunneries in Sicily and Sardinia. Moreover, they made crafts and sweets, ceroplastics and enamelled objects. Nowadays they make silk holy paraments, embroidered with gold and silver threads, or embellished with gems and pieces of coral; they also prepare hosts for several churches.

== Works ==
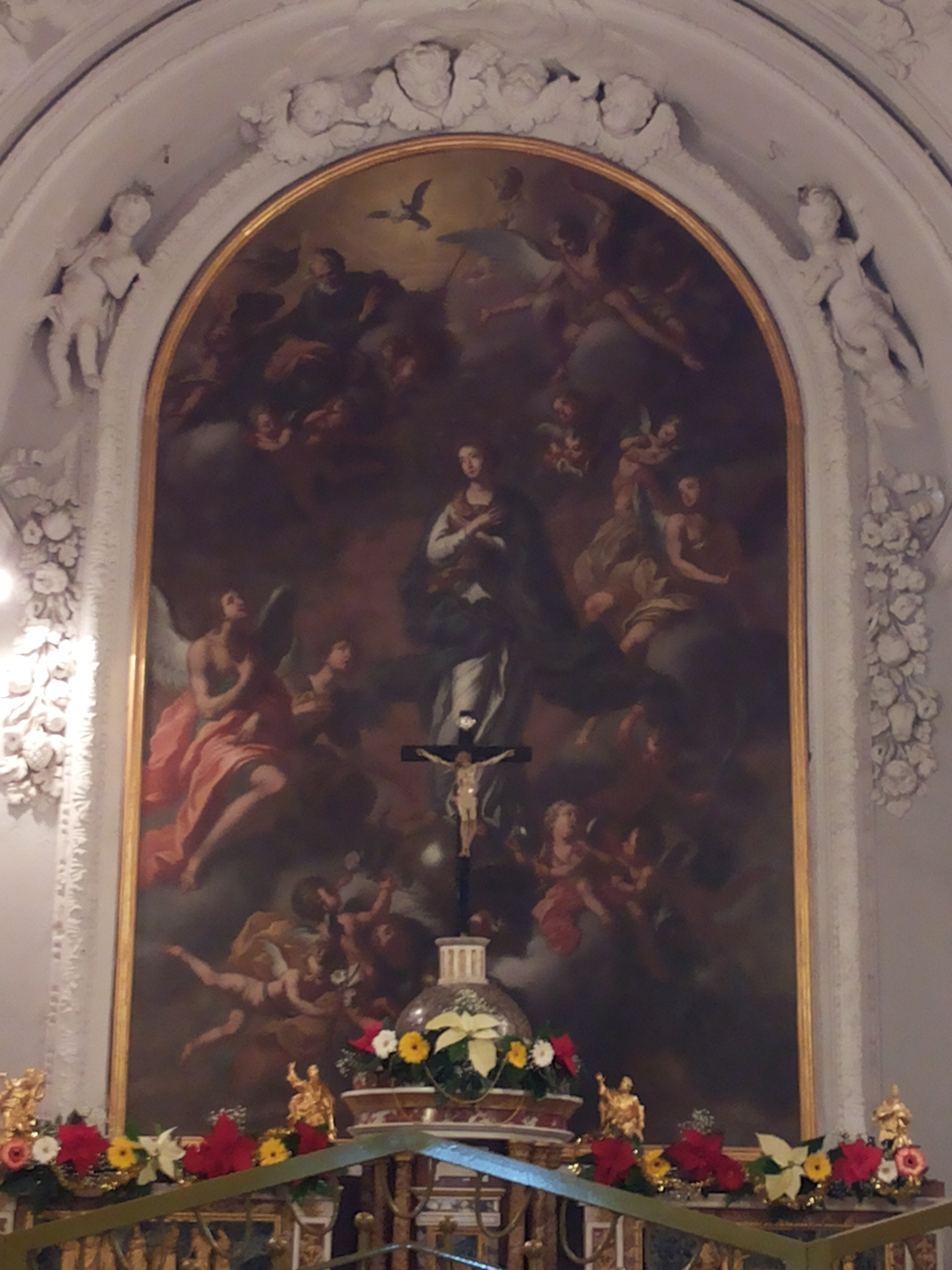
The Immaculate

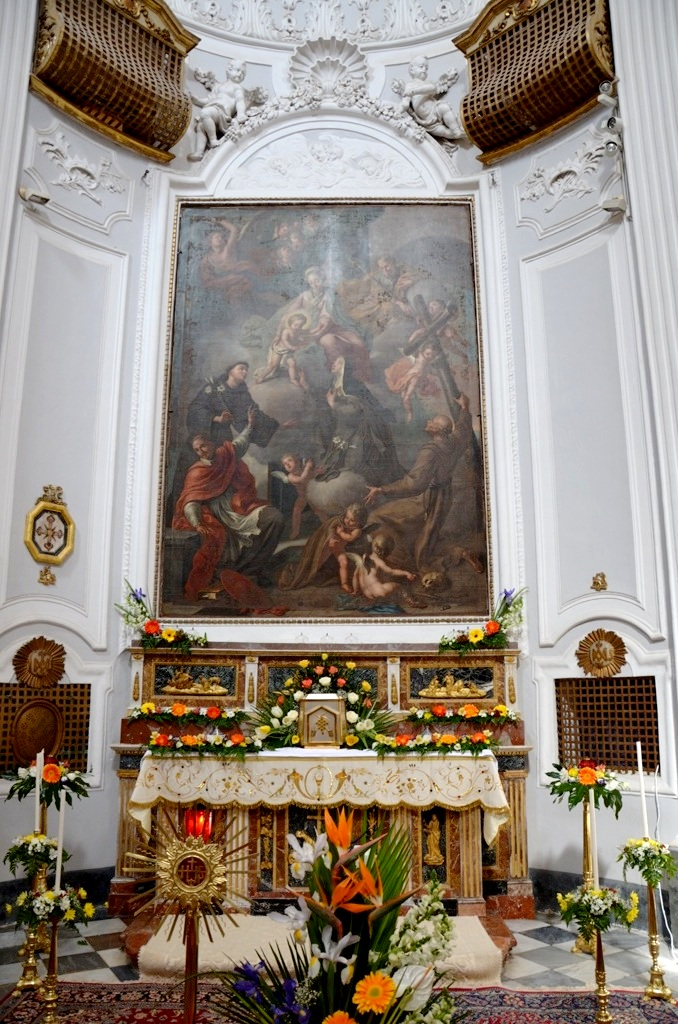
Presentation of the Infant Jesus to Saint Clare (1722)

The interior, organically arranged with its various elements, is embellished by the stuccoes made by Francesco Guastalla and Vincenzo Perez in 1722, and by those realized by Gabriele Messina in 1757.

Inside the church there are also:

- two paintings made by the Flemish painter Guglielmo Borremans: one of them (on the high altar) represents the Immaculate, the other (on the second right altar) Our Lady presenting the Infant Jesus to Saint Clare (1722);
- a wooden crucifix dated to the 17th century, on the second left altar;
- two paintings made in the 17th century by Andrea Carrera from Trapani representing Our Lady of Rosary (1658, on the first left altar) and Our Lady with Angels (1669, on the second right altar);
- two statues made in 1722 by Giacomo Serpotta representing Justice and Charity.

Inside the nunnery there is the Madonna di Passavia (Our Lady of Passavia), a painting made by Giuseppe Renda.

=== Serpotta's statues ===
By the sides of the apse there are two stucco statues, sustained by cloud-shaped brackets: one represents Justice, the other Charity or Piety. They were realized in 1722 by Giacomo Serpotta on behalf of Saint Clare's nunnery and are beautiful, delicate, and full of sensual glamour.

Justice, the fundamental virtue regulating human relations, is represented by a female figure with a quietly severe face; on the right hand she holds steelyard balance (to stress a right and pondered judgement) and on the left hand, on the contrary, she waves a sword, the symbol of the inflexible, but right. justice.

Charity (1722), instead, represents a young bride in a quiet contemplation, holding her child in her lap, crying because he wants the mother's milk. According to some experts, she smiles for piety and, instead of being sad about the son's weeping, she is nearly glad for his pressing pangs of hunger and loiters a little, instead of satisfying him.

The expression of Charity comes up by the side of the attitude of Justice. In this way, Serpotta wished to represent better the feelings of love, piety and justice.

== Sources ==
- Brogi, Paolo. Uomini e donne del sud: Ritratti di vite straordinarie e dell'orgoglio meridionale (in Italian). Imprimatur editore.
- Ciccarelli, Diego; Valenza, Marisa Dora (2006). La Sicilia e l'Immacolata: non solo 150 anni : atti del convegno di studio ... (in Italian). Palermo: biblioteca francescana officina di studi medievali.
- Salvatore Boscarino, Marcello Fagiolo, Emanuele Fidone, Joerg Garms, Simona Gatto, Maria Giuffré, Alexandra Kramer, Angela Marino, Anna Maria Matteucci, Paolo Nifosi, Marco Rosario Nobile, Stephen Tobriner: Rosario Gagliardi:I disegni di architettura della collezione Mazza. (Una grande raccolta del Settecento siciliano), Gangemi editore
- Cataldo, Carlo (2001). La conchiglia di S. Giacomo. Alcamo: Edizioni Campo.
