= Giacomo Serpotta =

Italian sculptor

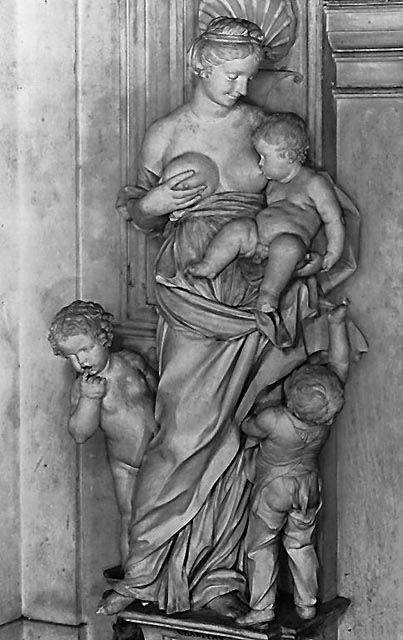
Gesso Charity, Oratorio di San Lorenzo, Palermo

Giacomo Serpotta (10 March 1656 – 27 February 1732) was an Italian sculptor, active in a Rococo style and mainly working in stucco.

== Biography ==
Serpotta was born and died in Palermo; and may have never left Sicily. His skill and facility with stucco sculpture appears to have arisen without mentorship or direct exposures to the mainstream of Italian Baroque. Rudolf Wittkower describes him as an aberrancy in an otherwise provincial scene, a "meteor in the Sicilian sky".

In 1677, along with Procopio de Ferrari, he decorated the small church of the Madonna dell’Itria in Monreale. His first independent work appears to be in 1682 in connection with an equestrian statue cast of Charles II of Spain and Sicily, which was cast in bronze by Gaspare Romano.

The Serpotta family, including his brother Giuseppe (1653–1719) and his son Procopio (1679–1755), was immensely prolific in Palermo, decorating churches and oratories. In style, he has a florid elegance that often recalls Antonio Raggi, a slightly older artist who was adept at stucco decoration and active in Rome.

For example, decorating the Oratory of San Lorenzo (1690/98–1706) with such a profusion of statuary, teeming with putti, that the walls appear to quiver with the movement of a crowd. He completed work also for the Oratory of Santa Cita; the Oratory of Rosario di San Domenico (1710–17); the Oratory of San Mercurio; the Oratory of Santa Caterina, adjacent to the church of the Olivella; and the chapel dell'Oratorio dei Santi Pietro e Paolo dell'Ospedale dei Sacerdoti. His work at the oratory of the Compagna della Carità di San Bartolomeo degli Incurabili in Palermo has been lost.

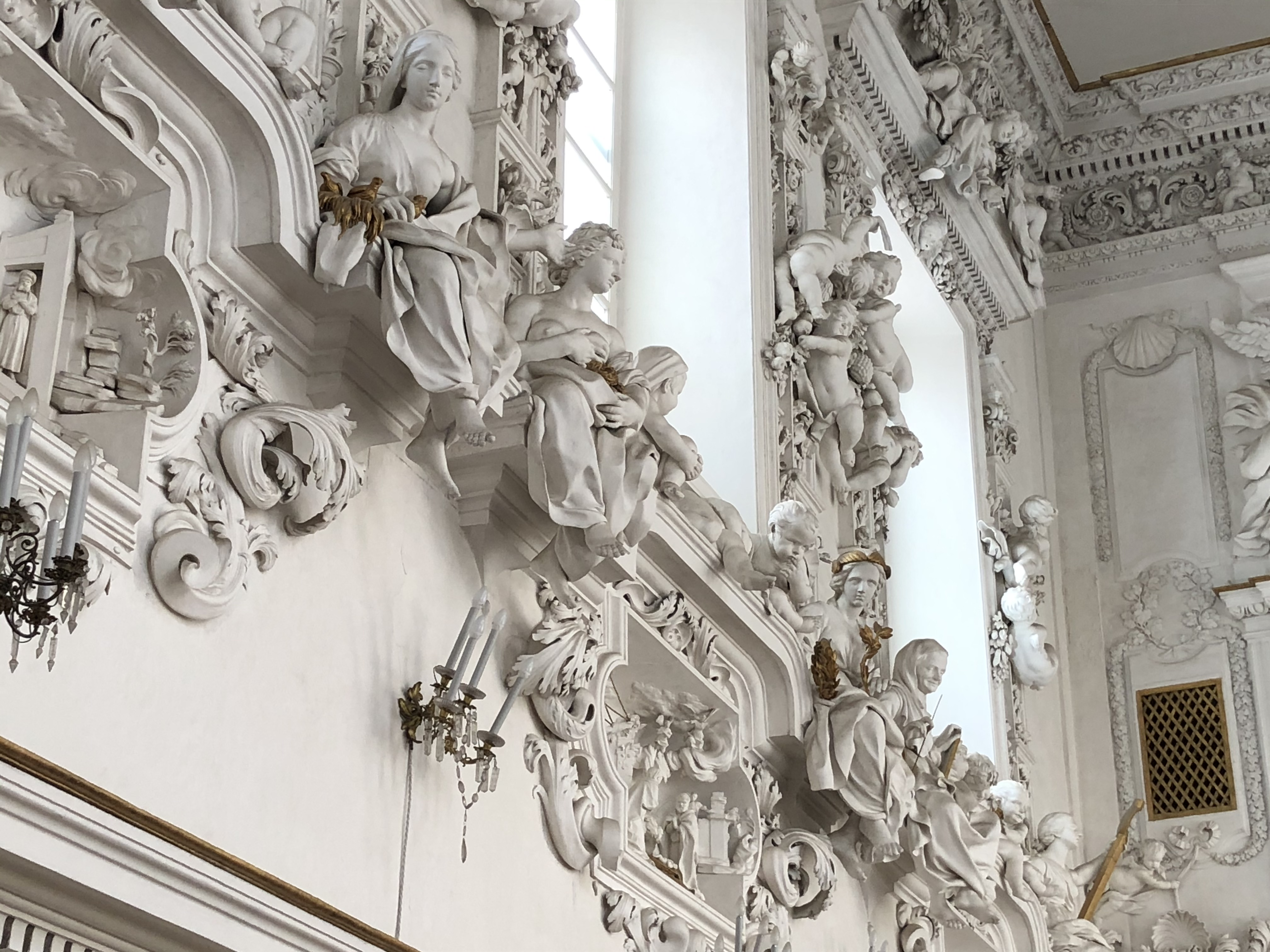
Santa Cita oratory, note the dioramas in the lower register and proliferation of figures and cherubs above

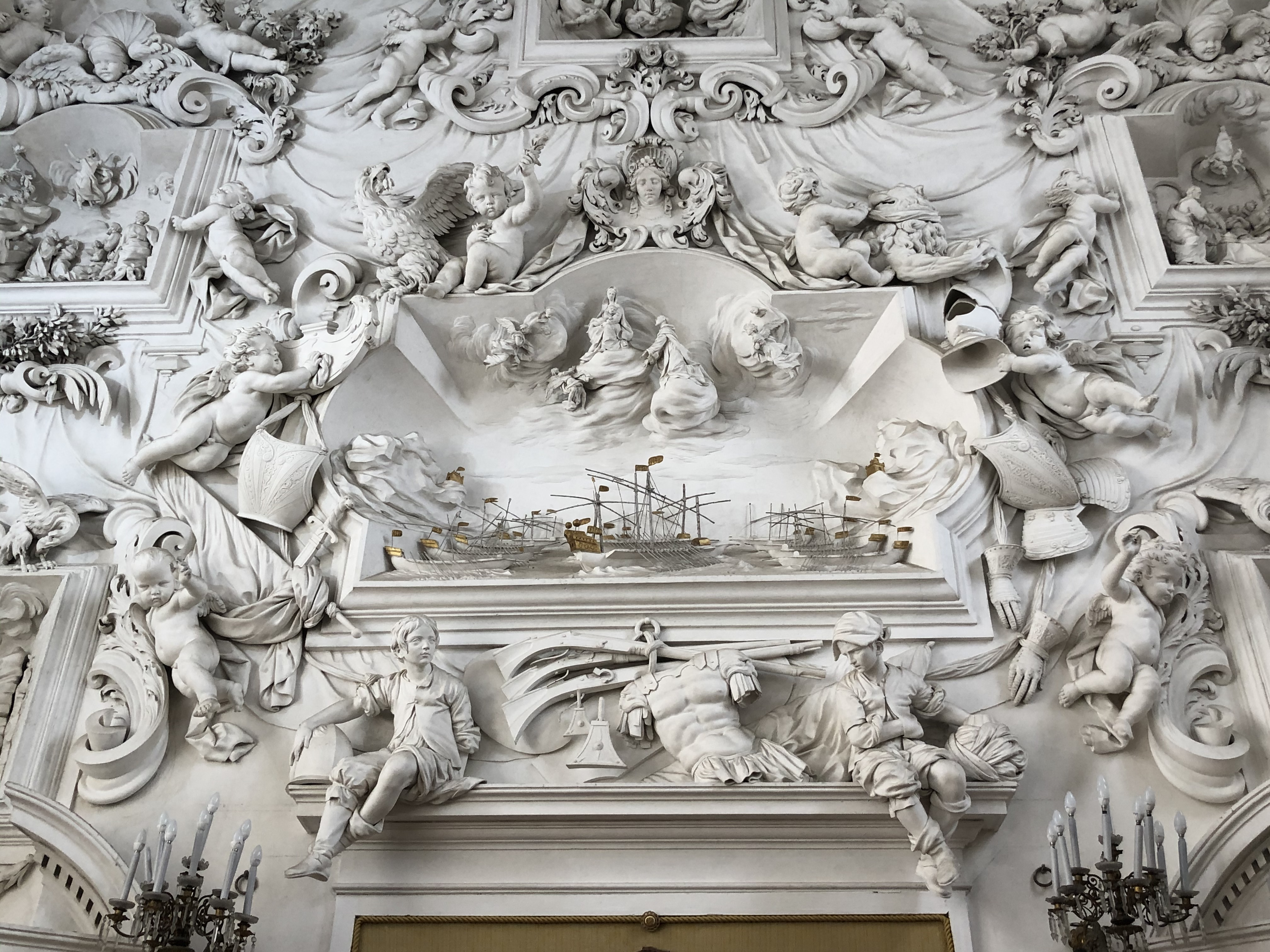
Center diorama depicting (presumably) St Dominic pleading to the Virgin to aid the Christians at the Battle of Lepanto

His stucco work for the oratories follows a general formula, but each elaboration is its individual tour de force. Two of the oratories are dedicated to the rosary, and the wall is divided into a series of tableaux or dioramas, each matching a Mystery of the Rosary, above these are allegorical figures or a fecundity of cherubs in playful frolic. The tableaux develops a program of prayer images, like a via crucis for contemplative prayer. The Santa Cita oratory is remarkable for its dioramas, coupled with almost genre like figures calling our attention from the moldings on which they perch. Between the doors entering the oratory is a remarkably detailed depiction of a naval battle, referencing the Battle of Lepanto. In the frames above and below are a trophy of arms, including helmets and body armor, and a Hapsburg eagle spreads its wings.

He also decorated the Archbishop's Palace in Santa Chiara; the Badia Nuova; and the Saints Cosmas and Damian's Church in Alcamo.

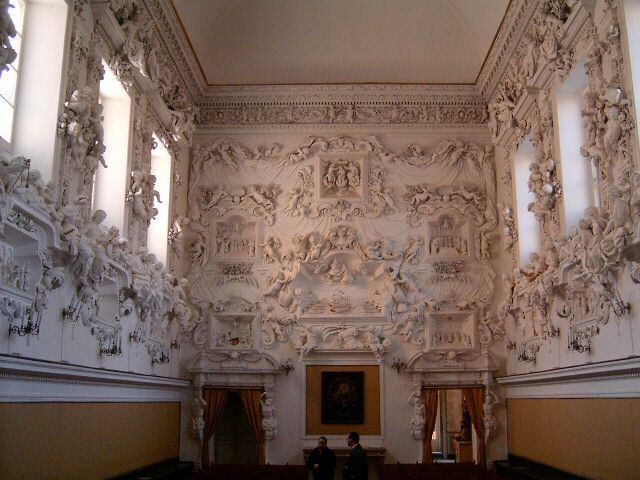
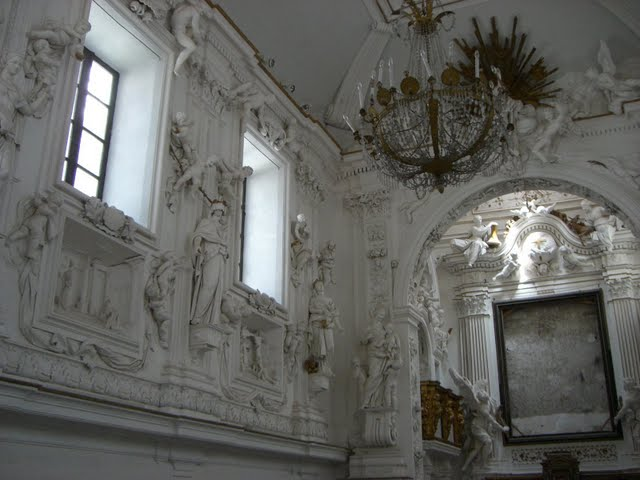
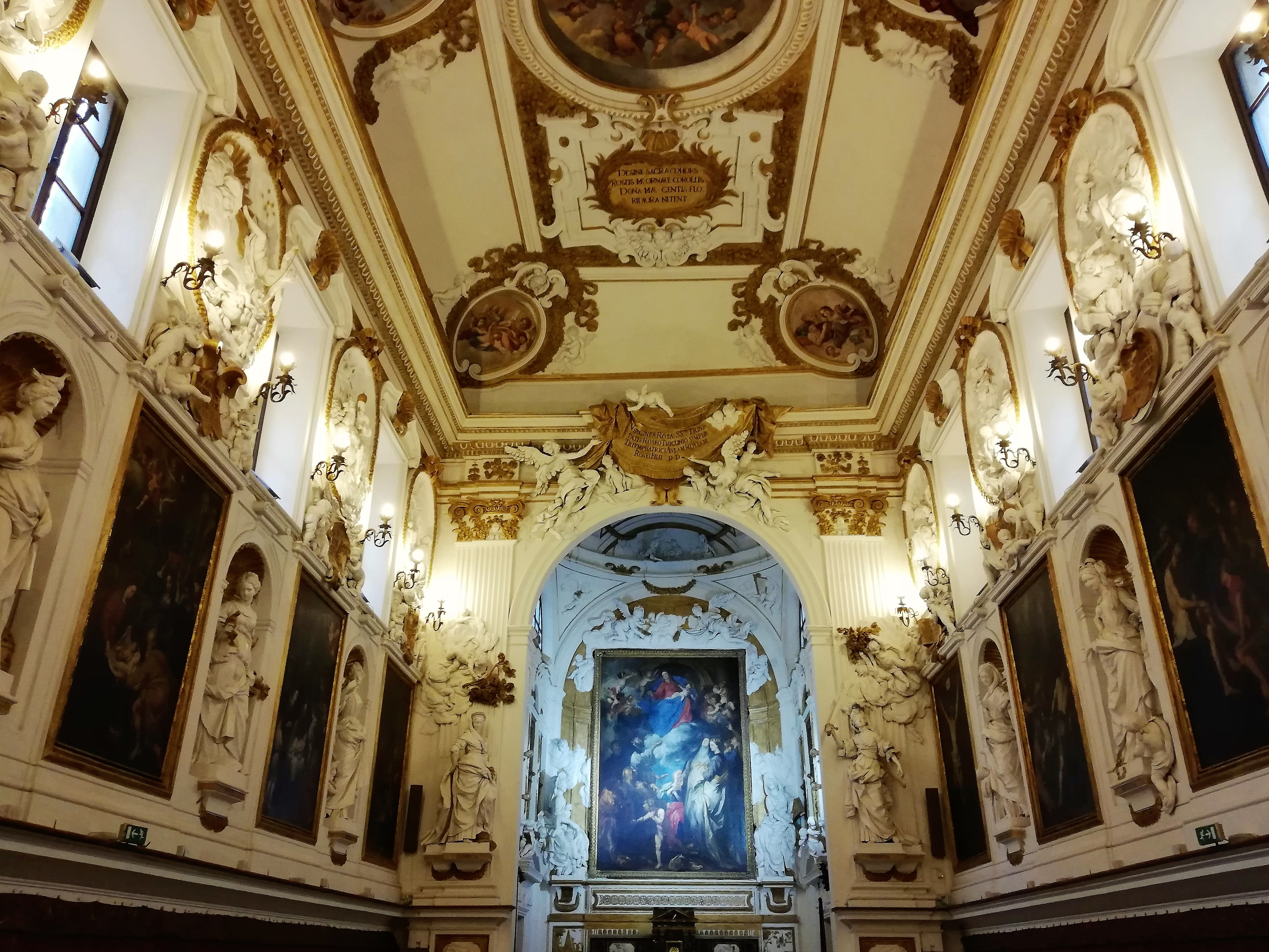
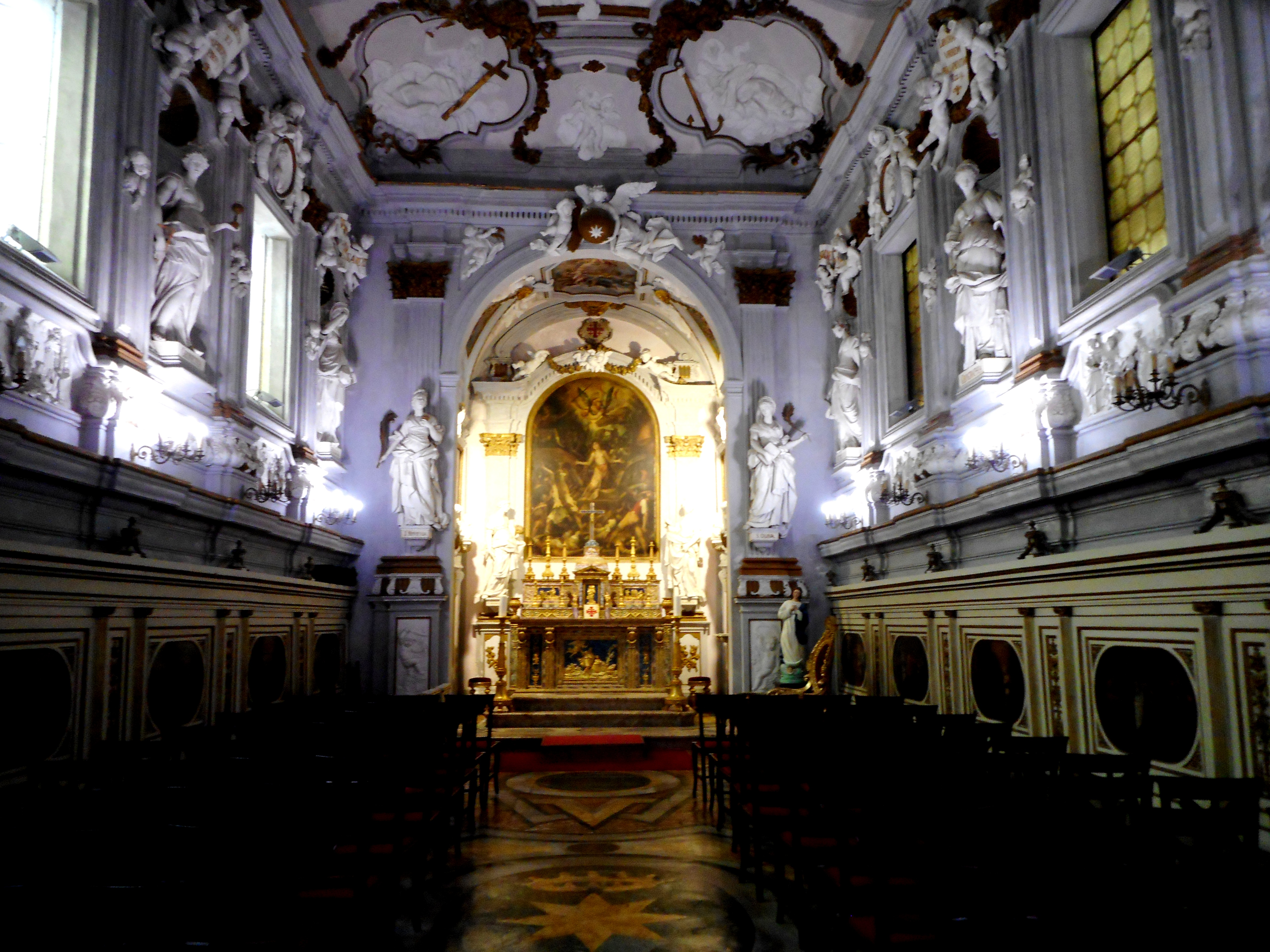
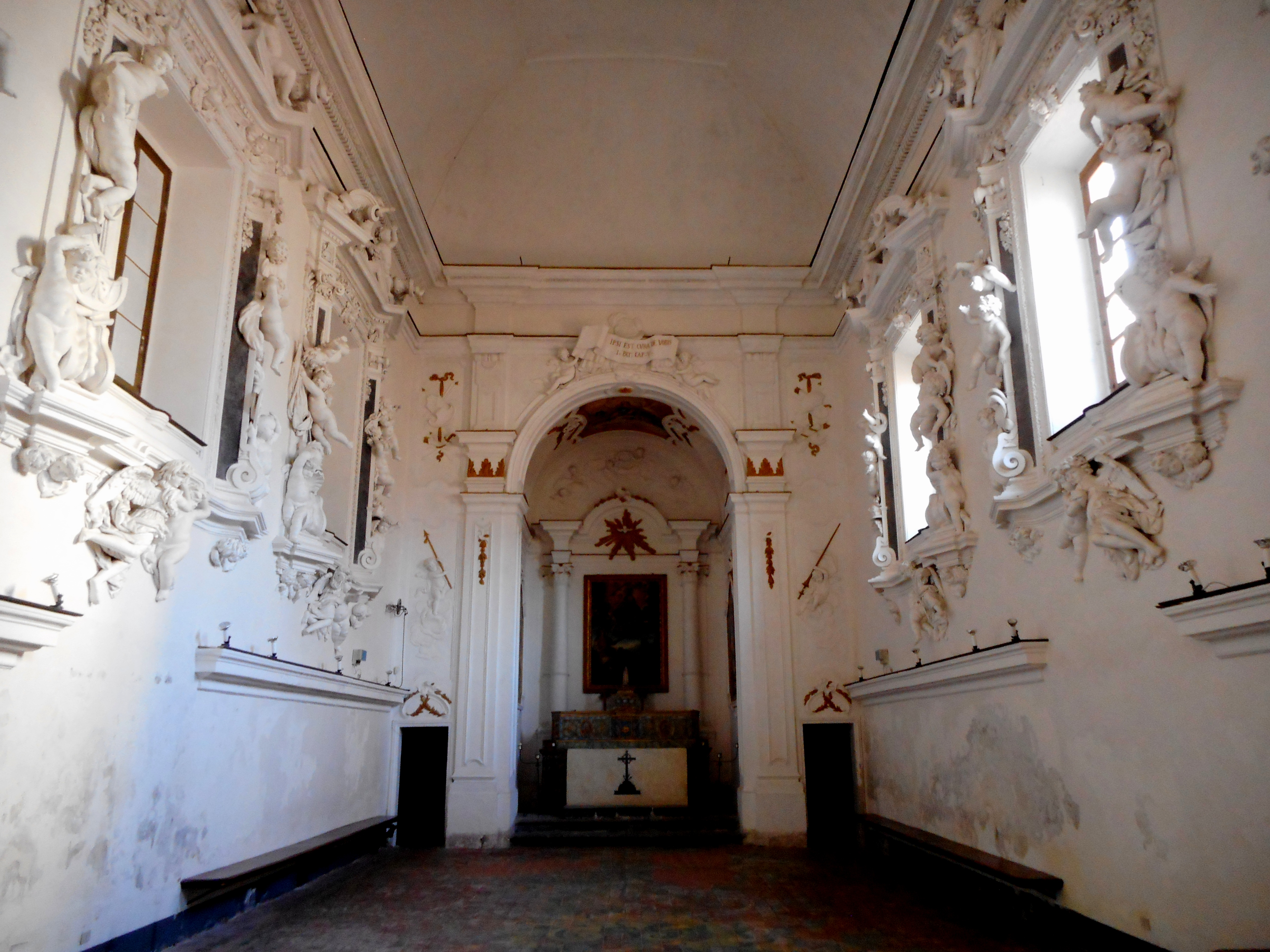
Five Oratories in Palermo decorated by Serpotta
| Santa Cita | San Lorenzo | San Domenico | Santa Caterina | San Mercurio |
| 38°07′15″N 13°21′47″E | 38°07′00.07″N 13°21′59.15″E | 38°07′10.52″N 13°21′50.16″E | 38.12037°N 13.36044°E | 38.10978°N 13.35398°E |

== Gallery ==
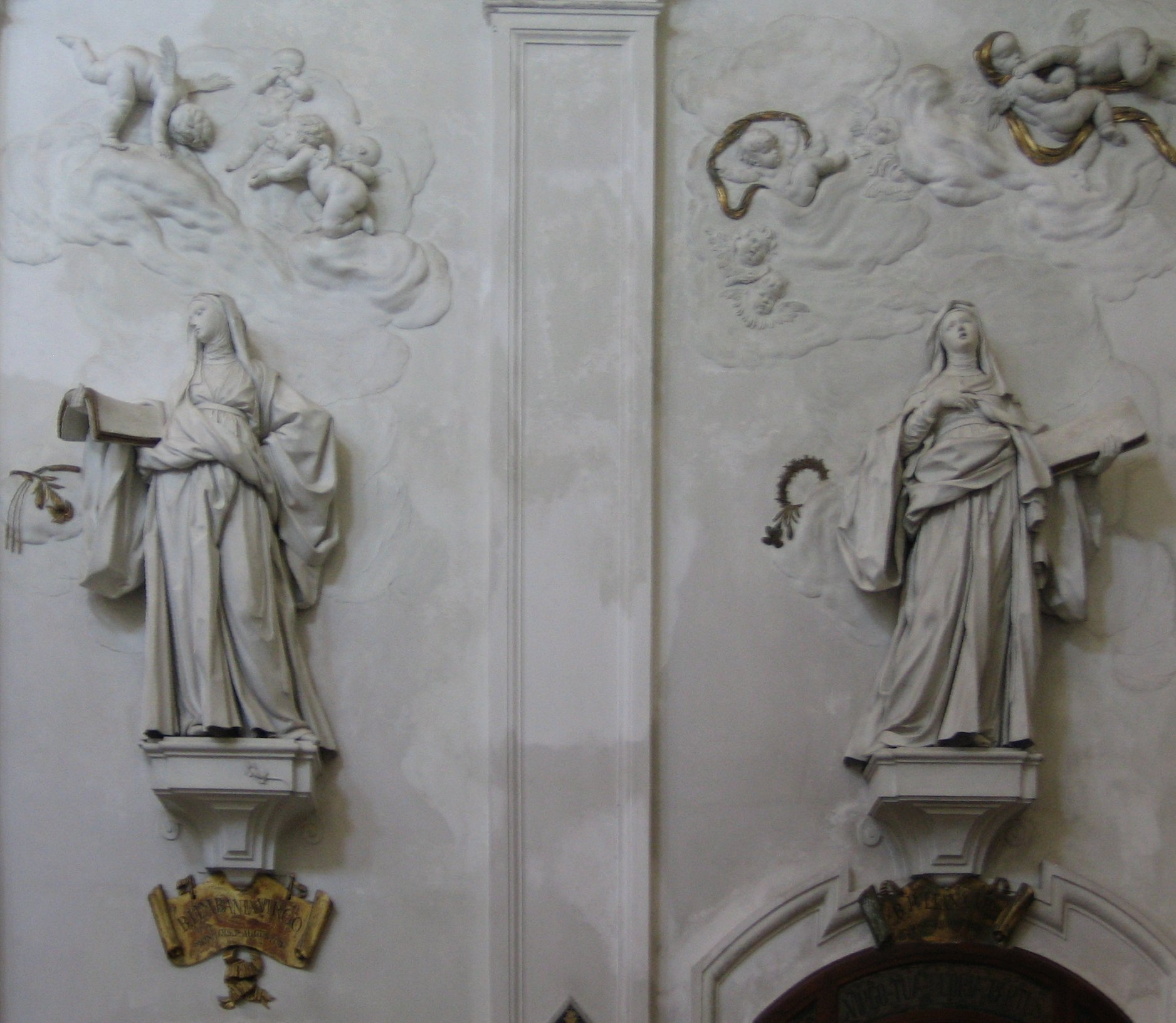
Oratorio di San Domenico, c.1600.

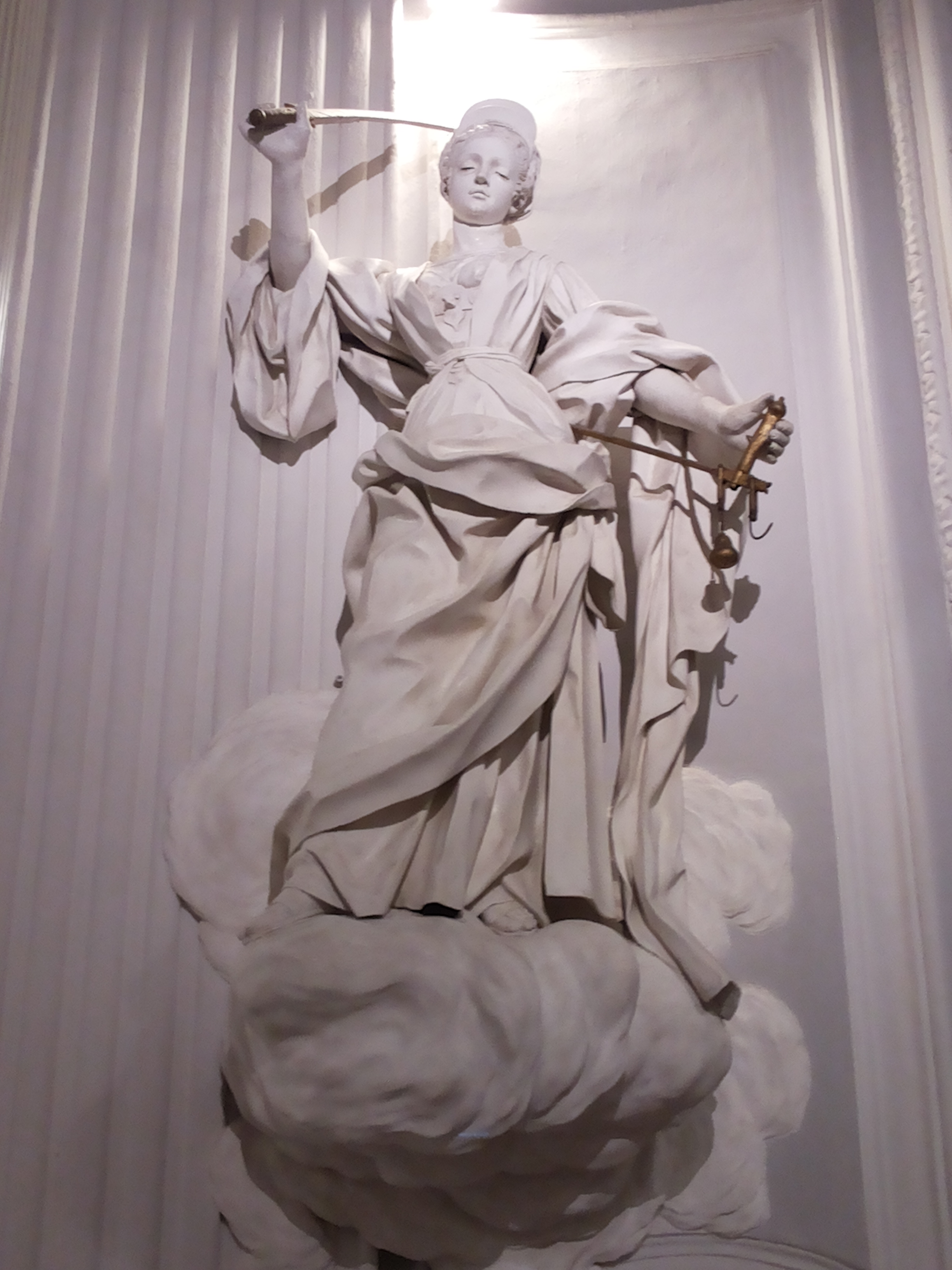
Justice, (one of four cardinal virtues) stucco, dated 1722 (Saints Cosmas and Damian's Church in Alcamo)

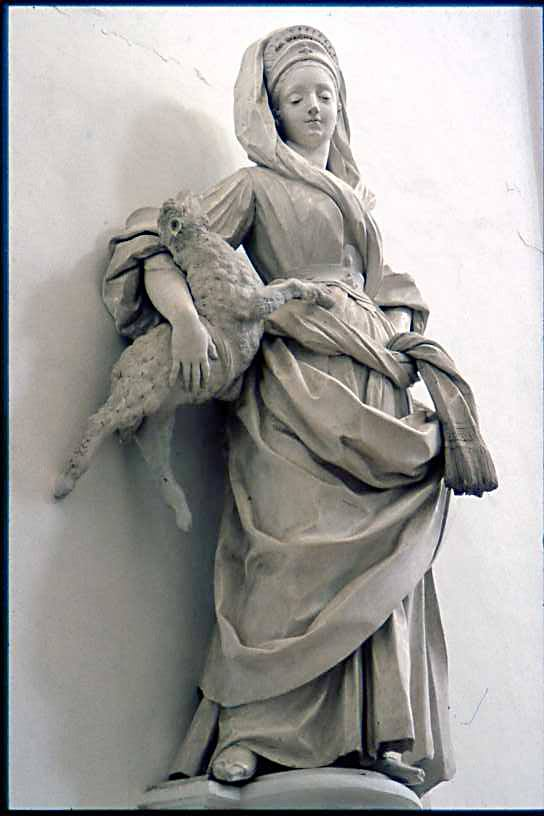
Prudence, stucco, dated 1724 Badia Nuova in Alcamo

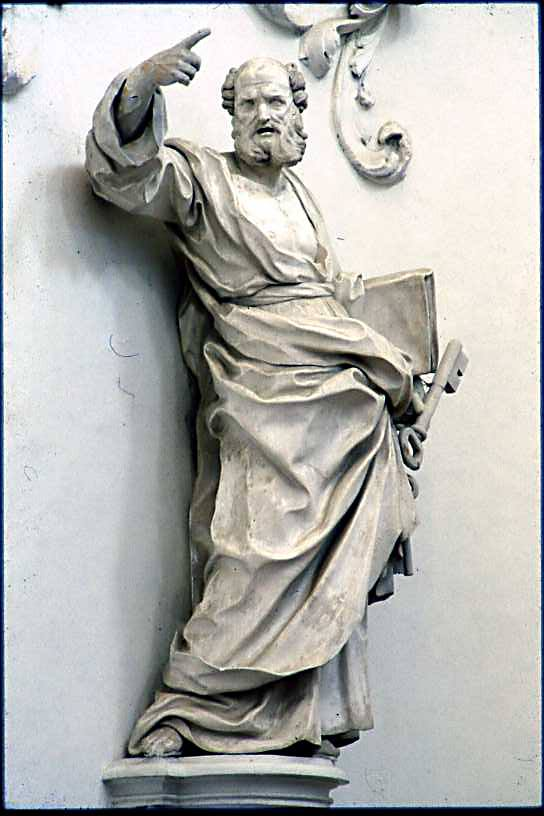
Saint Peter, Badia Nuova in Alcamo

== Sources ==
- Bruce Boucher (1998). Thames & Hudson, World of Art (ed.). Italian Baroque Sculpture. pp. 184–185.
- Wittkower, Rudolf (1993). Pelican History of Art (ed.). Art and Architecture Italy, 1600-1750. 1980. Penguin Books Ltd. pp. 458–459.
- Web Gallery of Art Biography
- Donald Garstang: Giacomo Serpotta and the Stuccatori of Palermo 1560-1790 (London, 1984)
