= Villa Giulia, Palermo =

Building in Palermo, Italy

Coordinates: 38°6′49″N 13°22′32″E

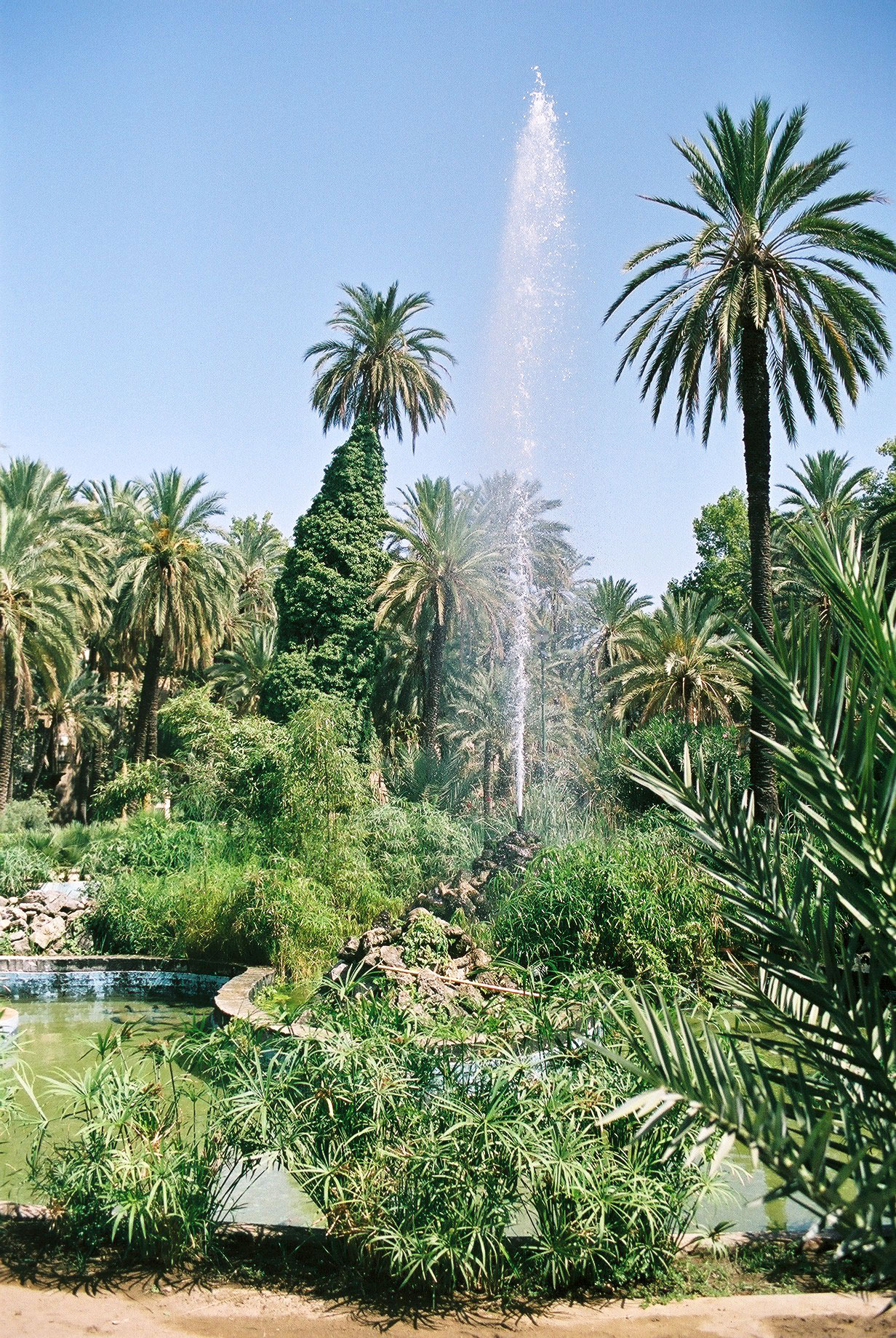
Palm trees and fountain in Villa Giulia

The Villa Giulia, also known as Villa del Popolo, and as Villa Flor is an urban public park, lying to the east of the Botanical Garden of Palermo, in the region of Sicily, Italy.

== History ==
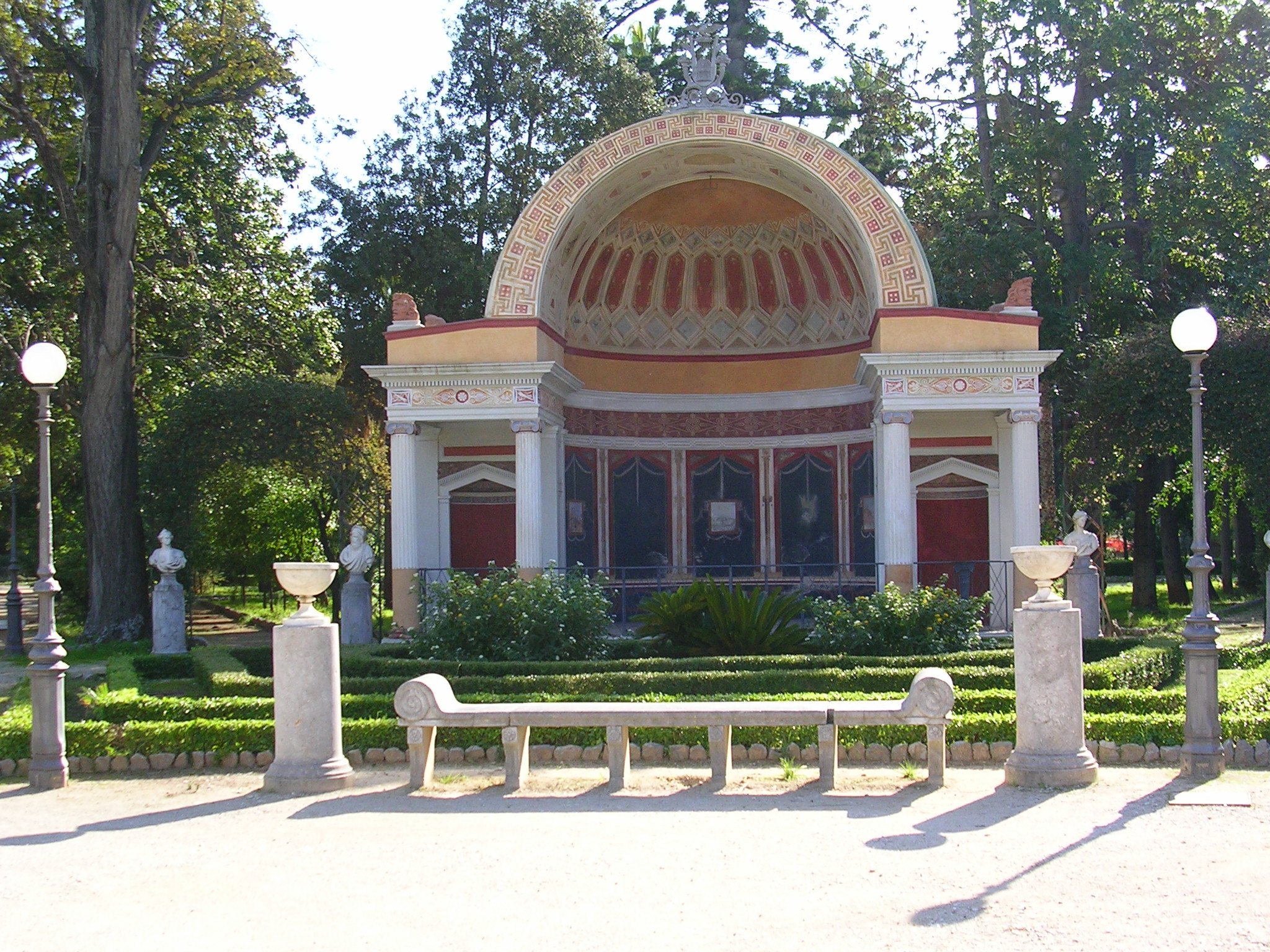
The southern exedra which faces the central fountain

The park was commissioned by magistrate D. Antonino La Grua e Talamanca, marquis of Regalmici, in 1777 with inspiration from Giovanni Meli. Designed by Nicolò Palma, the park is named after Giulia Guevara, wife of the then Viceroy of Sicily, Marcantonio Colonna, prince of Stigliano, and to whom the villa in this park was dedicated. Construction began that year and was completed in 1778. It became Palermo's first public park. It was extended and enlarged in 1866.

== The garden ==
The original entrance overlooking the Foro Italico is of a monumental neoclassical design. It has been permanently closed, however, so access to the garden is now obtained through the primary entrance on Lincoln Street. That gate area is less developed.

The heart of the villa is the dodecahedron fountain, featuring a sculpture of a dodecahedral marble clock created by the mathematician Lorenzo Federici, each face of the dodecahedron featuring a sundial. This is supported by a statue of Atlas by Ignazio Marabitti, set in the centre of a circular fountain. Decorations surrounding the fountain consist of various metal sculptures.

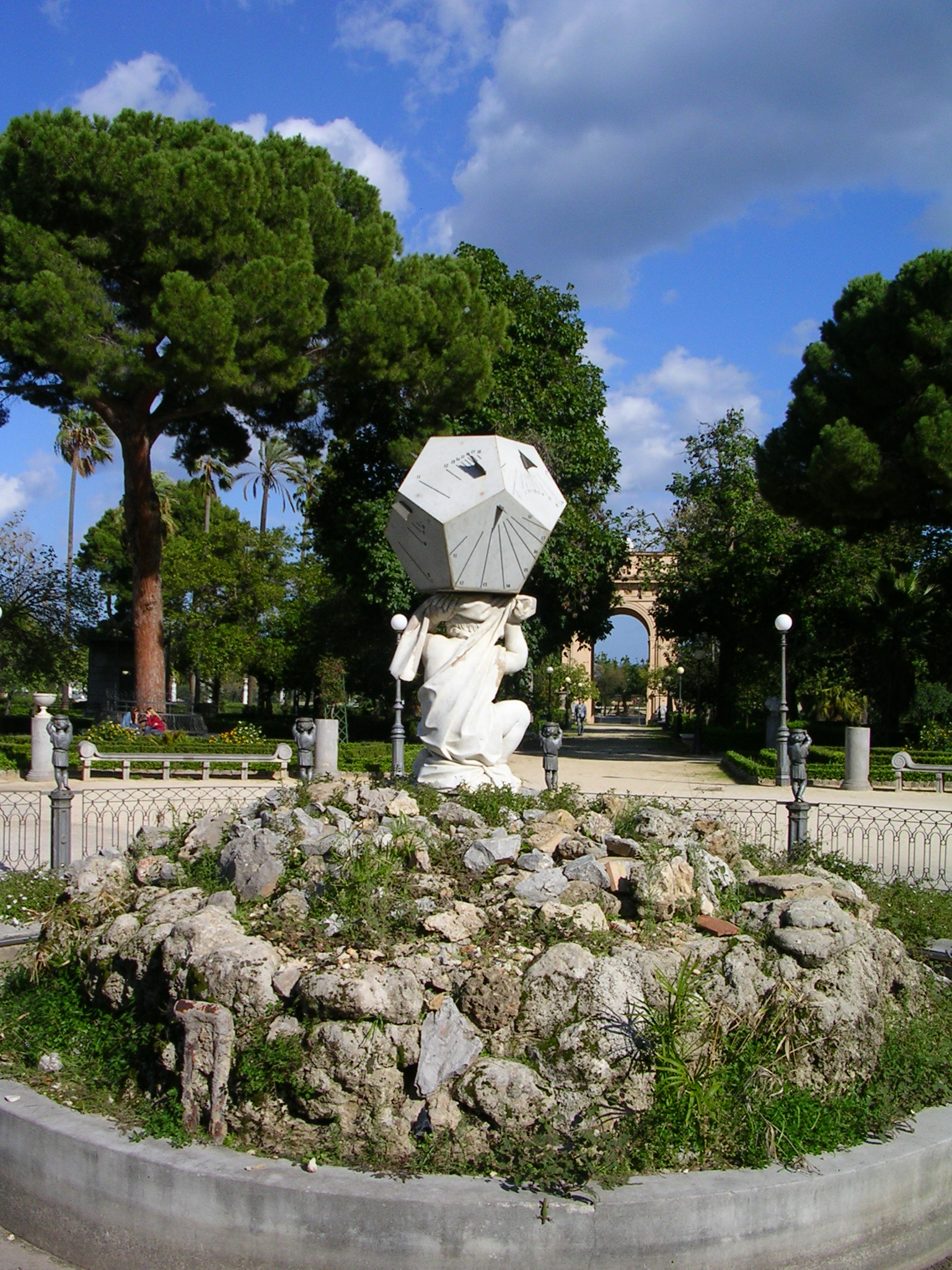
The central sundial in Villa Giulia

Around the central fountain are four exedra, designed by Giuseppe Damiani Almeyda and intended to be used for musical performances. The entire central square was originally used for musical and theatrical entertainment.

The four corners contained round seating areas, though only two of these still exist. The avenues of the garden are lined with various busts depicting notable people in the city's history.

Among the marble sculptures, the most significant is the "Fontana del Genio a Villa Giulia" – the Genius of Palermo which has become an emblem of the city, built in 1778 by Ignazio Marabitti.

== Restoration ==
From Spring 2003 until Autumn 2005 areas of the Garden were restored with pan-European funding.
