= Vito D'Anna =

Italian painter

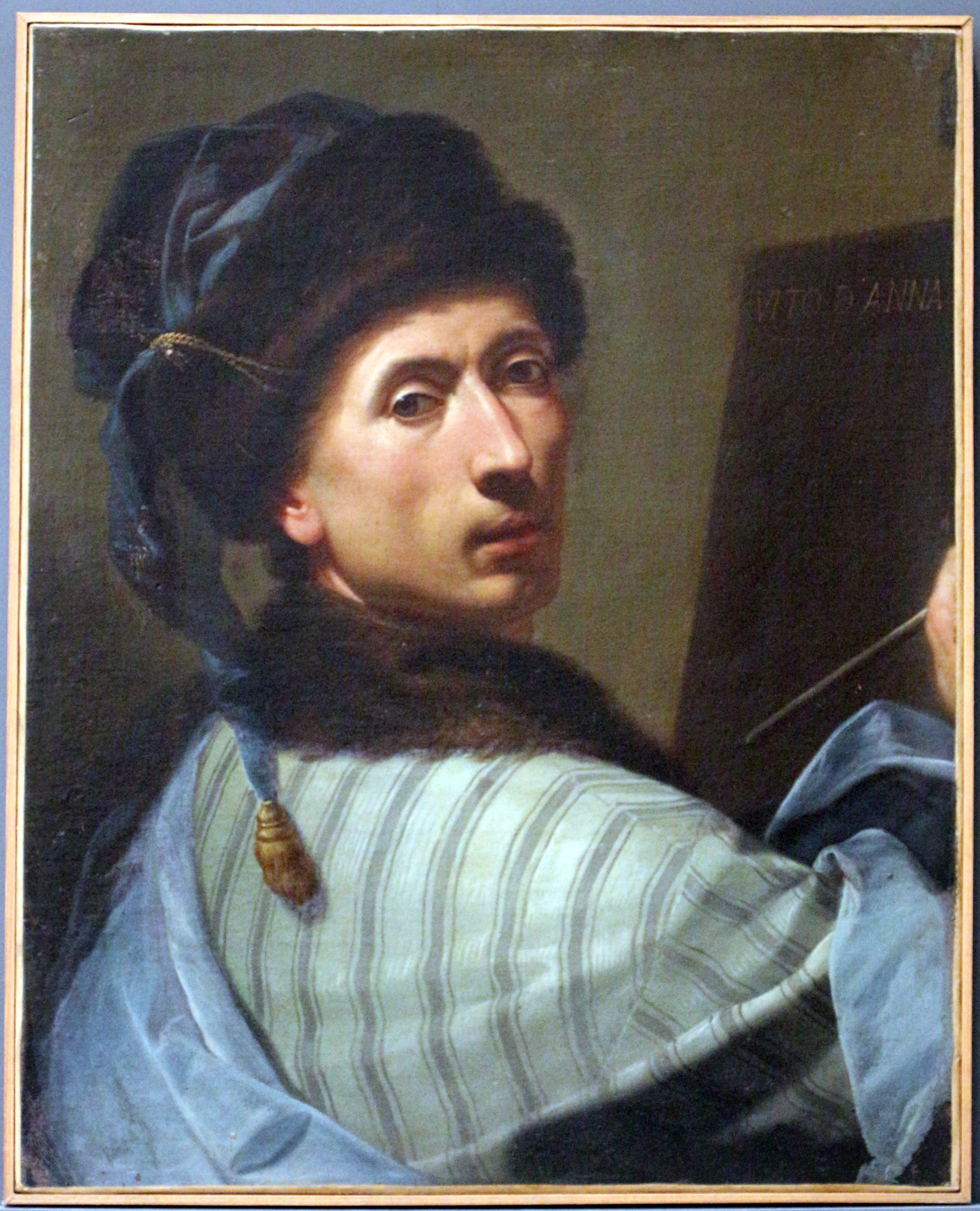
- Vito D'Anna, Self portrait, 1763.
- Born: 14 October 1718; Palermo, Kingdom of Sicily
- Died: 13 October 1769 (aged 50); Palermo, Kingdom of Sicily
- Known for: Painter
- Notable work: Apotheosis of St. Dominic; Apotheosis of Palermo; Allegory of Political Virtues; Glory of the Princes of Resuttana; Glory of St. Basil
- Movement: Baroque, Rococo

Vito D'Anna (14 October 1718 – 13 October 1769) was an Italian painter, considered the most prominent painter of Palermitan rococo and one of the most important artists of Sicily.

== Biography ==
He was the father of Alessandro D'Anna, the brother-in-law of Francesco Sozzi, and the son-in-law of Olivio Sozzi.

He studied in Acireale under Pietro Paolo Vasta from 1736 to 1744, when he returned to Palermo. In Acireale, he had painted Portrait of the Provost Gambino. Returning to Palermo, Vito married the daughter of the Catanese painter Olivio Sozzi. Sozzi helped arrange D'Anna to work with the circle of an aged Corrado Giaquinto in Rome.

D'Anna frescoed a number of palaces, and the churches of San Sebastiano, San Matteo and del Salvatore in Palermo. Among his works were: his fresco of the Madonna dei Raccomandati in the church of the same name, his Nativity in the church della Grotta, Self-portrait in the Pinacoteca Zelantea. His nephew, Giuseppe Patania, was also a painter.

== Works ==
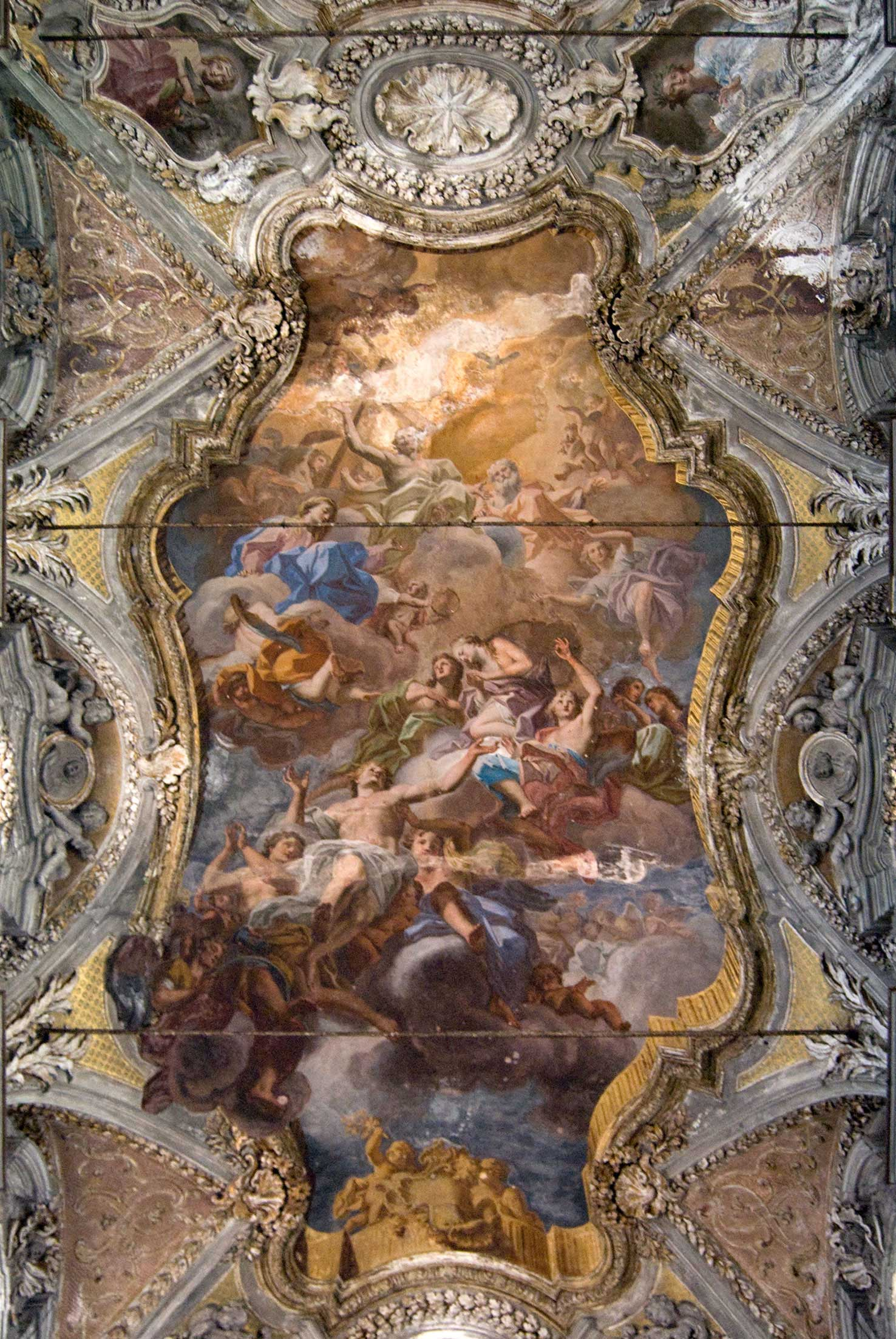
Triumph of the Souls in Purgatory, 1754. San Matteo al Cassaro, Palermo.

- Apotheosis of St. Dominic or Gloria dei santi domenicani, 1751, frescos of the dome, church Santa Caterina, Palermo.
- The Triumph of Minerva, 1751, fresco, Palazzo Benenati Ventimiglia, Palermo.
- Allegory of Virtues, 1751, frescos, Palazzo Benenati Ventimiglia, Palermo.
- Il Trionfo dei Re Magi, 1751–52, fresco, Chiasa dei Tre Re, Palermo.
- Trinità, oil on wood, Palazzo Abatellis, Palermo.
- Apotheosis of Palermo, 1760, fresco of the ballroom, Palazzo Isnello, Palermo.
- Allegory of Political Virtues, 1762, fresco of the ballroom, Palazzo Alliata di Pietratagliata, Palermo.
- Glory of the Princes of Resuttana, 1762, fresco of the ballroom, Villa Resuttana, Palermo.
- Glory of St. Basil, 1763–65, frescos, church of Santissimo Salvatore, Palermo.

== Honors ==
- In 1762 he was elected a member of the Academy of Saint Luke
- In 1765 he was named Count palatine
- In 1765 he became a Knight of the Order of the Golden Spur

== See also ==
- Apotheosis of Palermo
- Sicilian Baroque
- Rococo
