= Fountain of the Genius of Fieravecchia =

Historic fountain of Sicily, Italy

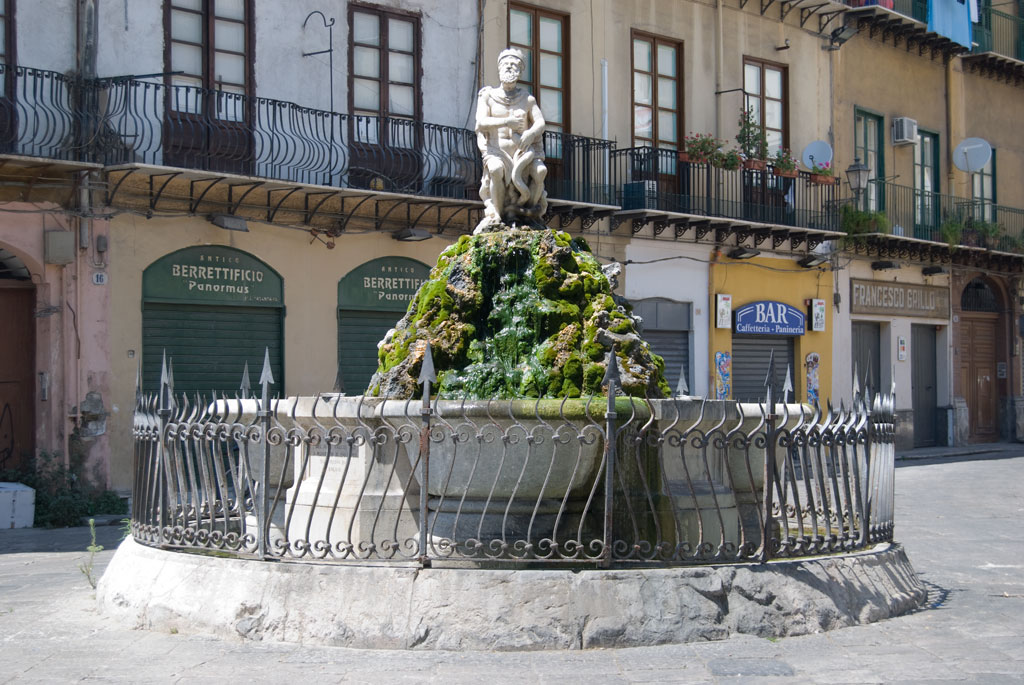
Fountain of the Genius of Fieravecchia

The Fountain of the Genius of Fieravecchia is a historic fountain located in Piazza Rivoluzione (formerly Fieravecchia) in the ancient quarter of Kalsa in the historic center of Palermo, region of Sicily, Italy.

The statue of the Genius of Palermo, depicting a symbol of city had been installed here in the 17th-century, but removed by the Bourbon administration after the Sicilian revolution of 1848, but after the liberation of Sicily by Garibaldi in 1860, the fountain and statue, which had become a patriotic symbol, were reunited, and the piazza renamed. The now Piazza Rivoluzione is a small square at the intersection of Via Aragona, Via Schiavuzzo, Via Piazza Teatro Santa Cecilia, Via Divisi, and Via Garibaldi. It borders on the church of San Carlo dei Milanesi and one block east of both the Palazzo Valguarnera Gangi and the Regio Teatro Santa Cecilia.

There are over half a dozen stone monuments depicting the Genius of Palermo in the city, including another fountain at Villa Giulia. This statue and fountain were installed by Luigi Moncada, Prince of Paterno and Duke of Montalto. The marble font had previously been in the port region, next to a monastery of Discalced Mercederians. The piazza itself was known since the early 13th century as Fieravecchia, and used to host a busy marketplace. Today it is surrounded by restaurants and bars.

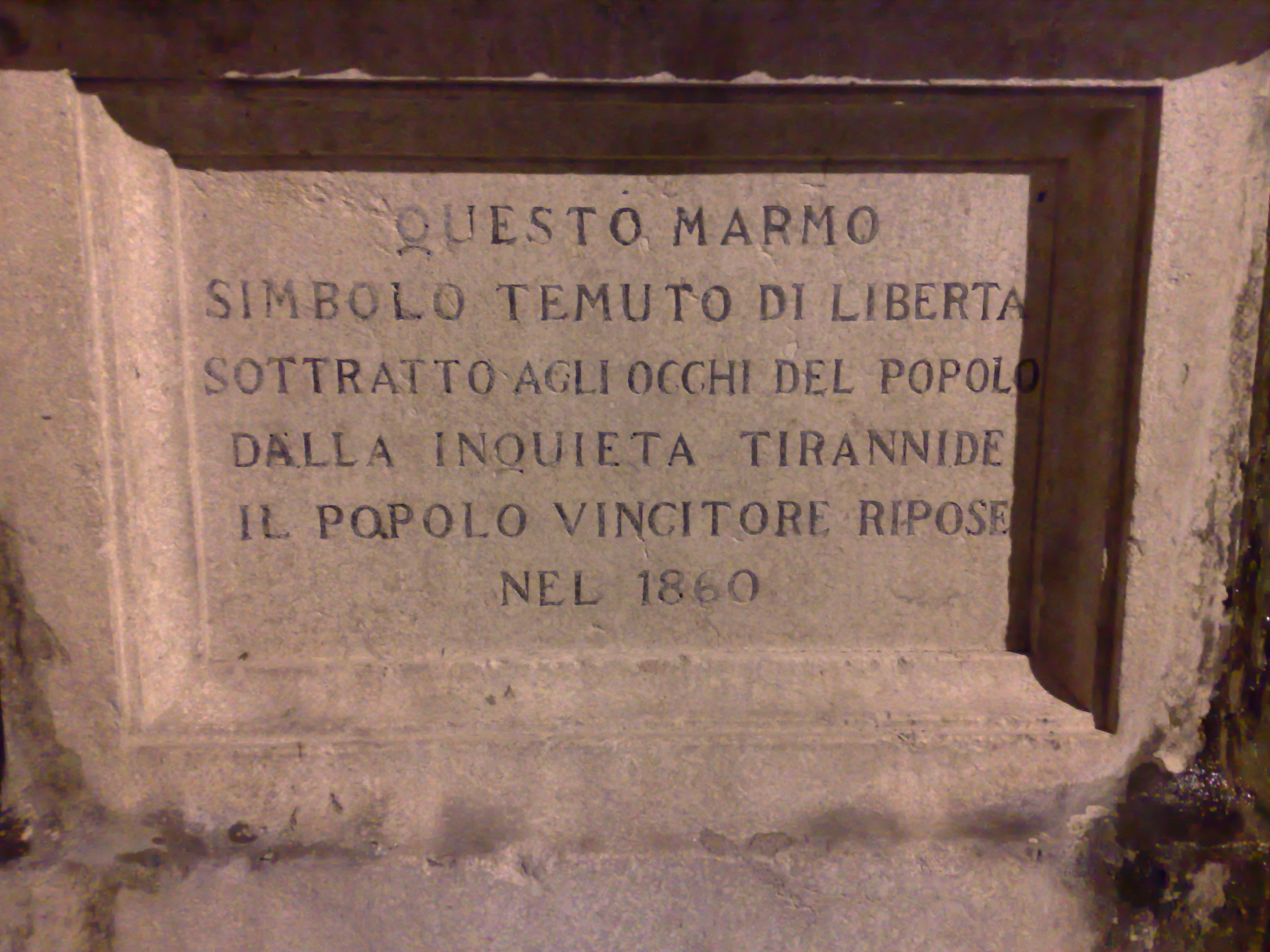
Inscription on Fontana del Genio

The statue is placed atop a mossy mountain. The statue is a sitting impassive king with a crown, allowing a large snake to feed from his breast. At the base of the fountain, a plaque reads: This marble/ feared symbol of liberty / removed from the eyes of the people/ by the restless tyranny/ the victorious people restored. Against the right flank of the church of San Carlo, facing the piazza, a marble plaque reads:

In this square that at the dawn of the assigned day saw the insurgents gather around the improvised tricolor and were the first to proclaim the freedom and democratic constitutions coveted by the peoples. Today celebrating the 1st centenary of January 12, 1848, the people of Palermo welcome and consecrate the vow of a world that, after the hardest labor, yearns to join together in pacts of more freedom.
