= Palazzo Isnello =

Building in Palermo, Sicily

Coordinates: 38°06′58″N 13°21′54″E

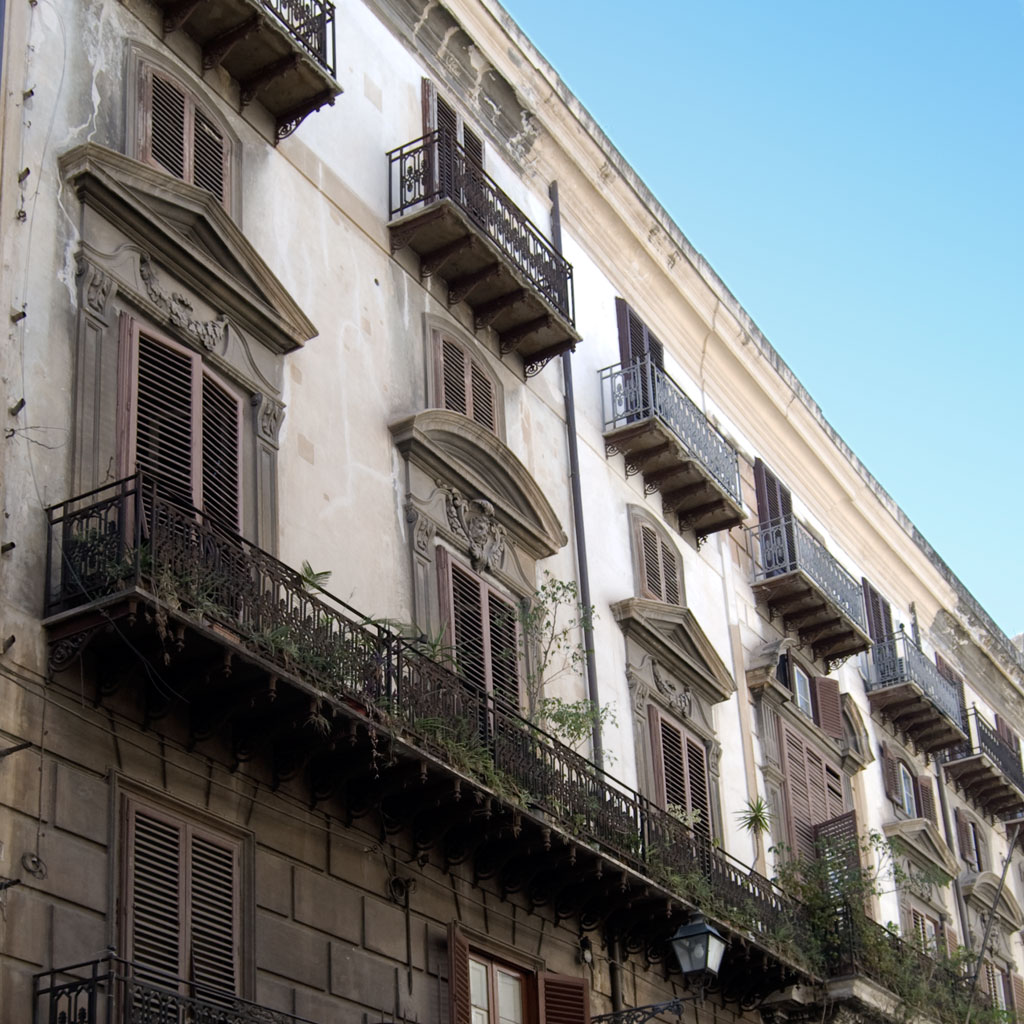
Palazzo Isnello, main facade.

Palazzo Isnello (also known as Palazzo Termine d'Isnello or Palazzo Sant'Antimo al Cassaro) is an historic palazzo situated between the ancient via del Cassaro and Piazza Borsa, in the Kalsa quarter of Palermo, Sicily.

On the piano nobile of the house, the vault of the ballroom is frescoed with an Apotheosis of Palermo, one of seven monumental representations of the Genius of Palermo, ancient numen of the city. There is also a fresco depicting an allegory of The Four Seasons, painted by Francesco Sozzi.

== History ==
The house, constructed during the 18th century and completed circa 1760, was designed by an anonymous architect for the Counts of Isnello and Princes of Baucina. The palazzo was built incorporating six existing medieval houses.

In the 19th century the historian Michele Amari lived in the palace until 1843, when he became unwelcome to the Bourbons of Two Sicilies for his autonomist and revolutionary ideas expressed in a published article on the Sicilian Vespers war, and was forced into exile in France.

During World War II the building was hit by a U.S. bomb.

Since the 1980s the ballroom and other halls and rooms may be hired for functions; the remainder of the house remains a private residence. In 2006, for the bicentennial of the birth of Michele Amari, the city of Palermo placed a commemorative plaque on the east facade.
