= Francesco Sozzi =

Italian painter (1732–1795)

- Born: 26 May 1732; Palermo, Kingdom of Sicily
- Died: 1795; Palermo, Kingdom of Sicily
- Known for: Painter
- Notable work: The Four Seasons; Allegory of Wisdom
- Movement: Baroque, Rococo

Francesco Sozzi (26 October 1732 – 1795) was an Italian painter, active in style characteristic of the Rococo period in Palermo. He is distinguished from other fellow painters for his graceful, delicate, and elegant style.

He was the son of Olivio Sozzi and the brother-in-law of Vito D'Anna.

His main works are The Four Seasons, a cycle of four frescoes at Palazzo Isnello, and the Allegory of Wisdom, a fresco in the Library of the Palazzo Alliata of Pietratagliata. Other works are at various churches and houses in Palermo, Catania and Agrigento. Some of his drawings are preserved by the Gallery of Palazzo Abatellis.

== Bibliography ==
- Agostino Gallo, manuscript, 19th century.
- Citti Siracusano, La pittura del Settecento in Sicilia. Rome, De Luca, 1986.
- Giuliano Briganti (editor). La Pittura in Italia. Il Settecento (volume 2). Milan, Electa, 1990. ISBN 978-88-435-3279-7
- Giulia Sommariva. Palazzi nobiliari di Palermo. Palermo, Dario Flaccovio Editore, 2004. ISBN 88-7758-598-6
- Mariny Guttilla. Mirabile artificio. Pittura religiosa in Sicilia dal XV al XIX secolo. Palermo, Kalos, 2006. ISBN 88-89224-27-4
