= Cathedral of Syracuse =

Cattedrale metropolitana della Natività di Maria Santissima
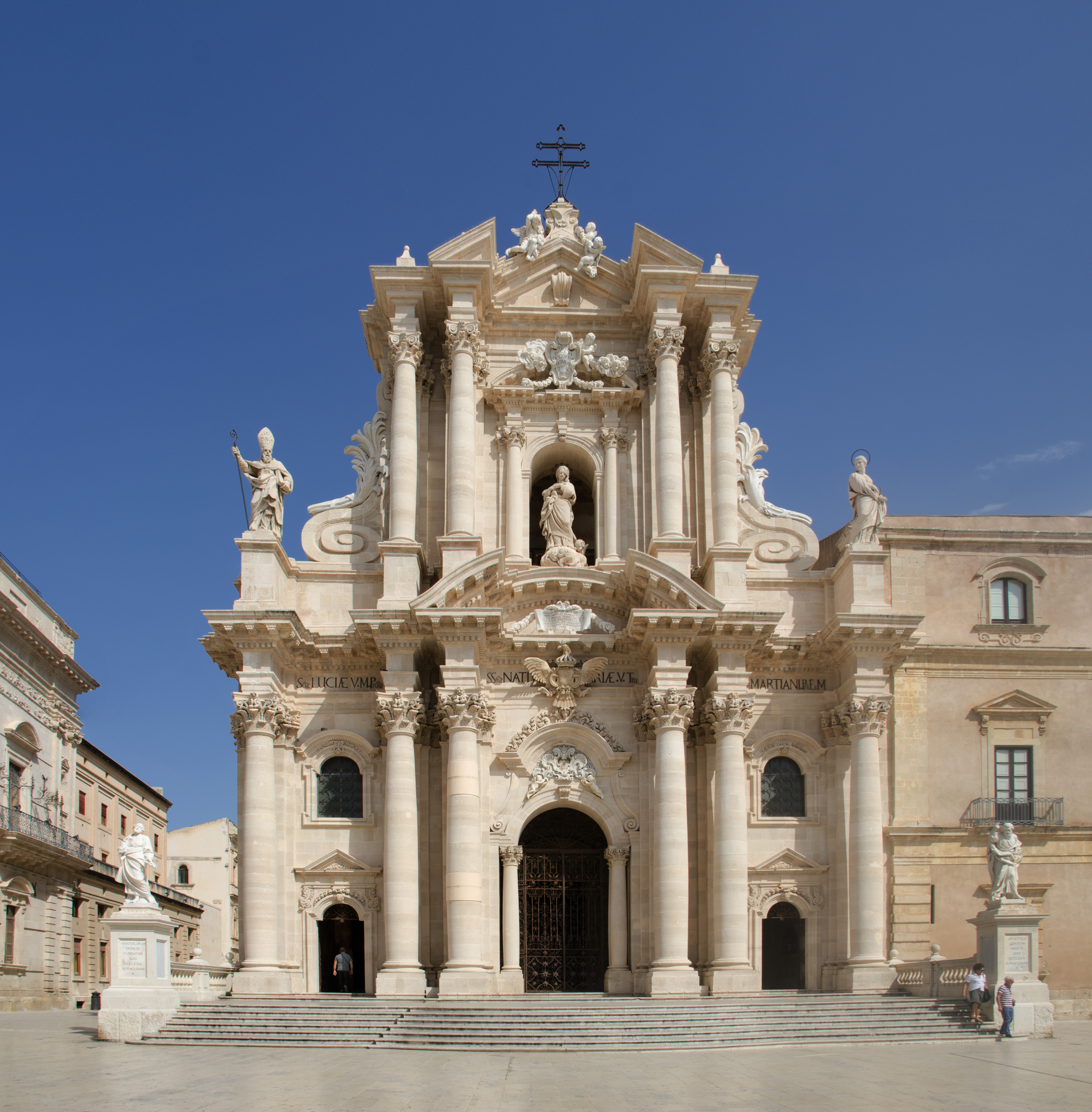
- The Baroque-style façade of the Cathedral of Syracuse

- Location within Sicily Location within Italy

Religion
- Affiliation: Catholic
- Region: Sicily

Location
- Country: Italy
- Coordinates: 37°03′35″N 15°17′36″E

Architecture
- Type: Cathedral
- Style: Sicilian Baroque

UNESCO World Heritage Site
- Part of: Syracuse and the Rocky Necropolis of Pantalica
- Criteria: Cultural: (ii)(iii)(iv)(vi)
- Reference: 1200-003
- Inscription: 2005 (29th Session)

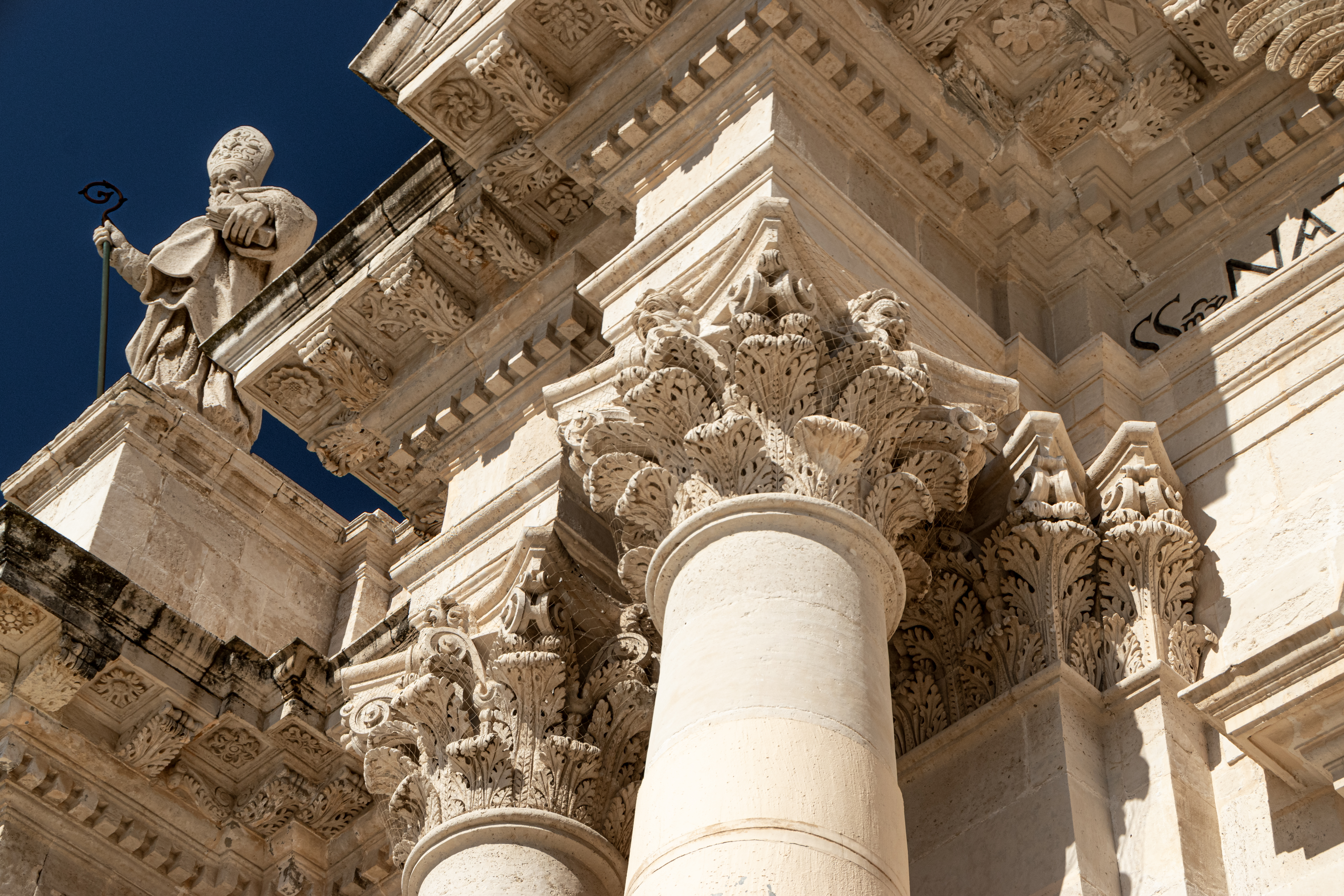
Carved acanthus leaves in the baroque façade

The Cathedral of Syracuse (Duomo di Siracusa), formally the Cattedrale metropolitana della Natività di Maria Santissima (Metropolitan Cathedral of the Most Holy Nativity of Mary), is an ancient Catholic church in Syracuse, Sicily, the seat of the Catholic Archdiocese of Siracusa. Its structure is originally a Greek doric temple, and for this reason it is included in a UNESCO World Heritage Site designated in 2005.

The cathedral stands in the city's historic core on Ortygia Island.

== History ==
The origins of a temple on this site date to prehistory. The great Greek Temple of Athena was built in the 6th century BC [590–580 BCE] . The temple was a Doric edifice with six columns on the short sides and 14 on the long sides. Plato and Athenaeus mention the temple, and the looting of its ornament is mentioned by Cicero, in 70 BC, as one of the crimes of the governor Verres.

Archeological site excavations by Paolo Orsi in 1907–1910 show the Greek temple to have been built on even older foundations, and uncovered a wealth of archaic and pre-Hellenic artefacts. Many are held by the Museo archeologico regionale Paolo Orsi in Syracuse.

The present cathedral was constructed by Saint Bishop Zosimo of Syracuse in the 7th century. The battered Doric columns of the original temple were incorporated in the walls of the current church. They can be seen inside and out. The building was converted into a mosque in 878, then converted back after the Norman count Roger I of Sicily retook the city in 1086. The roof of the nave is of Norman origin, as well as the mosaics in the apses.

As part of the increased building activity after the 1693 Sicily earthquake, the cathedral was rebuilt and the façade redesigned by architect Andrea Palma in 1725–1753. The style is classified as High Sicilian Baroque, a relatively late example. The double order of Corinthian columns on the façade provide a classic example of carved Acanthus leaves in the capitals. Sculptor Ignazio Marabitti contributed the full-length statues on the façade.

The interior of the church, a nave and two aisles, combine rustic walls and Baroque details. Features include a font with marble basin dating from the 12th or 13th century, a ciborium (an altar canopy) designed by architect Luigi Vanvitelli, and a statue of the Madonna della Neve ("Madonna of the Snow", 1512) by Antonello Gagini.

== St. Lucy ==
As of 2015 the cathedral holds a number of relics of St. Lucy, the patroness of the city: a number of bone fragments, a robe, a veil, and a pair of shoes. Twice a year on the first Sunday in May and on December 13, her feast day, a statue of Saint Lucy by sculptor Pietro Rizzo (1599) is brought out of the cathedral and paraded through the streets. The silver statue incorporates three fragments of her ribs within its chest.

The cathedral shares the Piazza Duomo with the Church of Santa Lucia alla Badia, a short walk to the south. That church used to display the Caravaggio painting Burial of St. Lucy, now housed in the church of Santa Lucia al Sepolcro in Syracuse.

== World Heritage Site ==
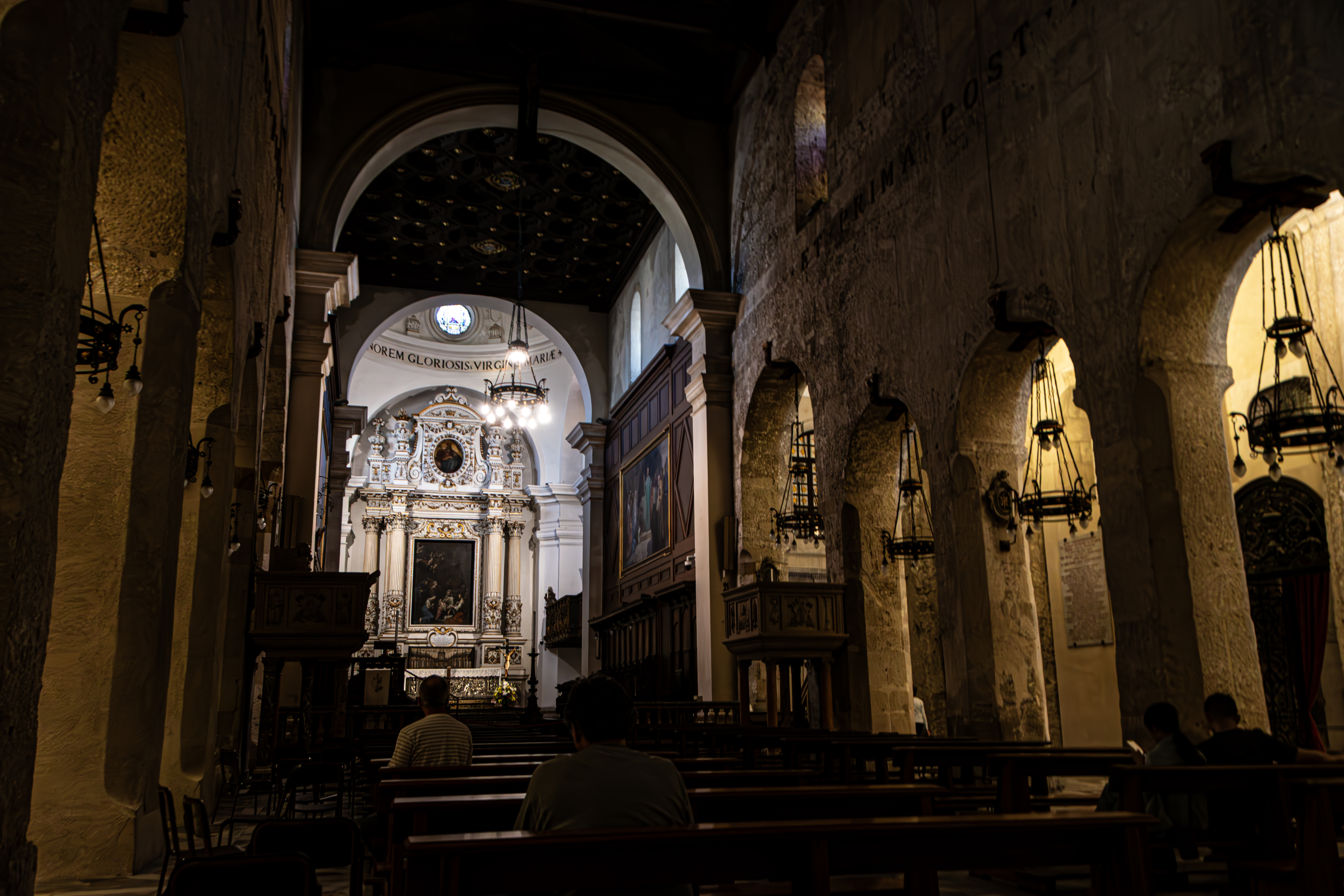
Main nave

The cathedral stands as a major element of the historic core of Syracuse. Since 2005, the entire city of Syracuse, along with the Necropolis of Pantalica, was listed as a World Heritage Site by UNESCO. This programme aims to catalogue, name and conserve sites of outstanding cultural or natural importance to the common heritage of humanity.

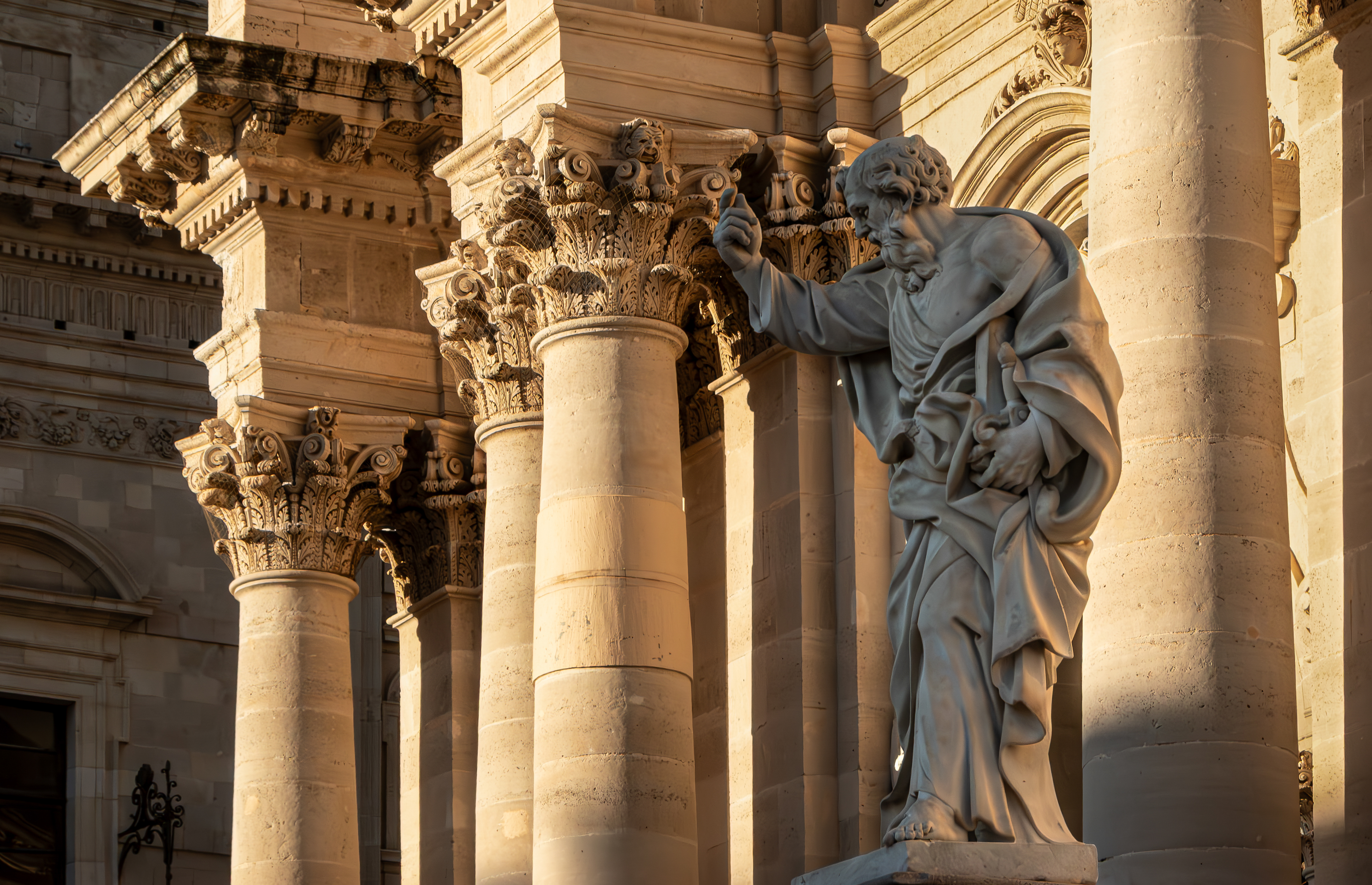
Ignazio Marabitti's Statue of Saint Paul in front of the baroque facade of the cathedral

The deciding committee which evaluates potential candidates described their reasons for choosing Syracuse because "monuments and archeological sites situated in Syracuse are the finest example of outstanding architectural creation spanning several cultural aspects; Greek, Roman and Baroque", following on that Ancient Syracuse was "directly linked to events, ideas and literary works of outstanding universal significance".

== Gallery ==
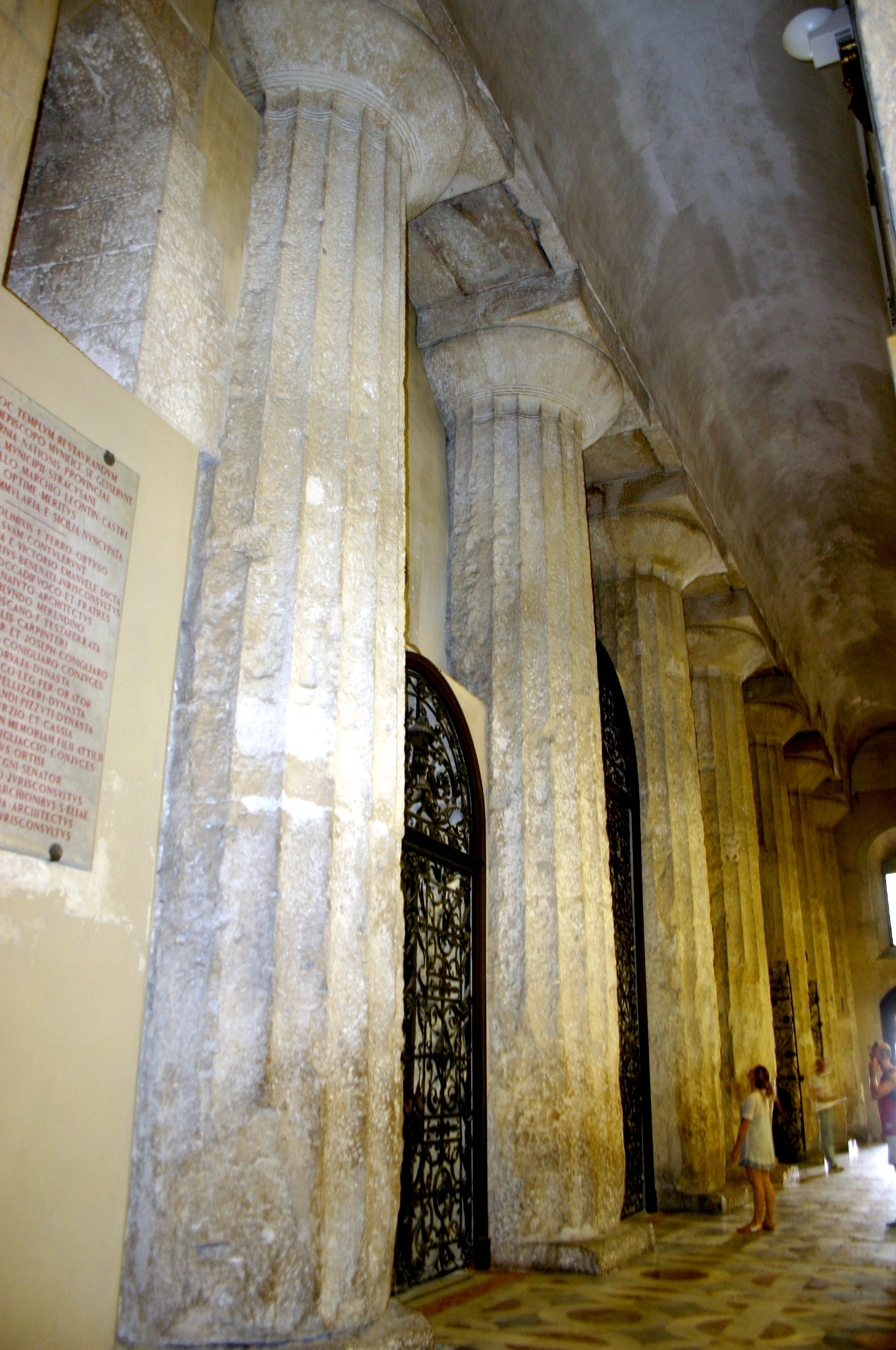
ancient columns of the Temple of Athena, incorporated into the cathedral (interior)

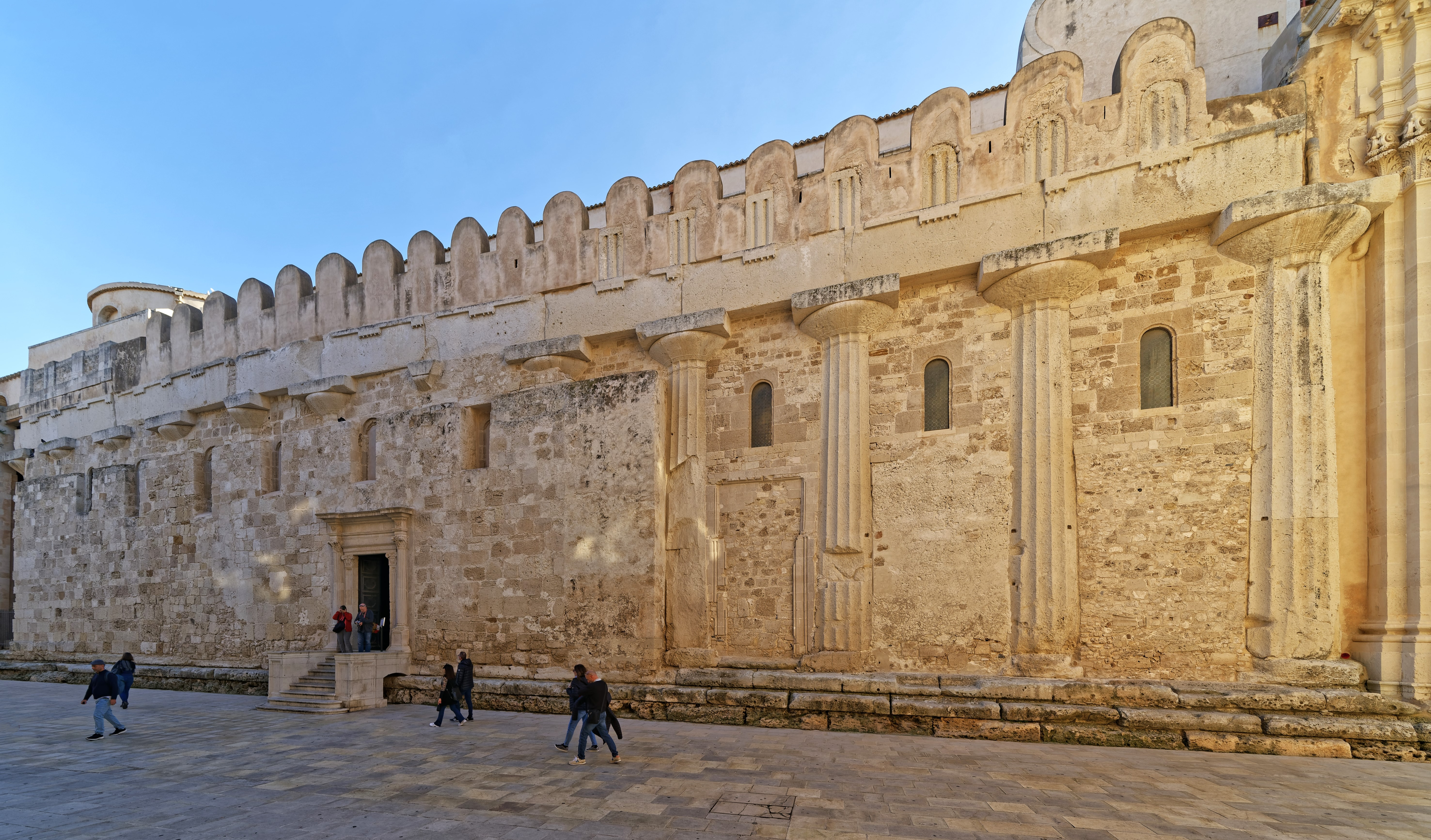
The Greek columns on the outside

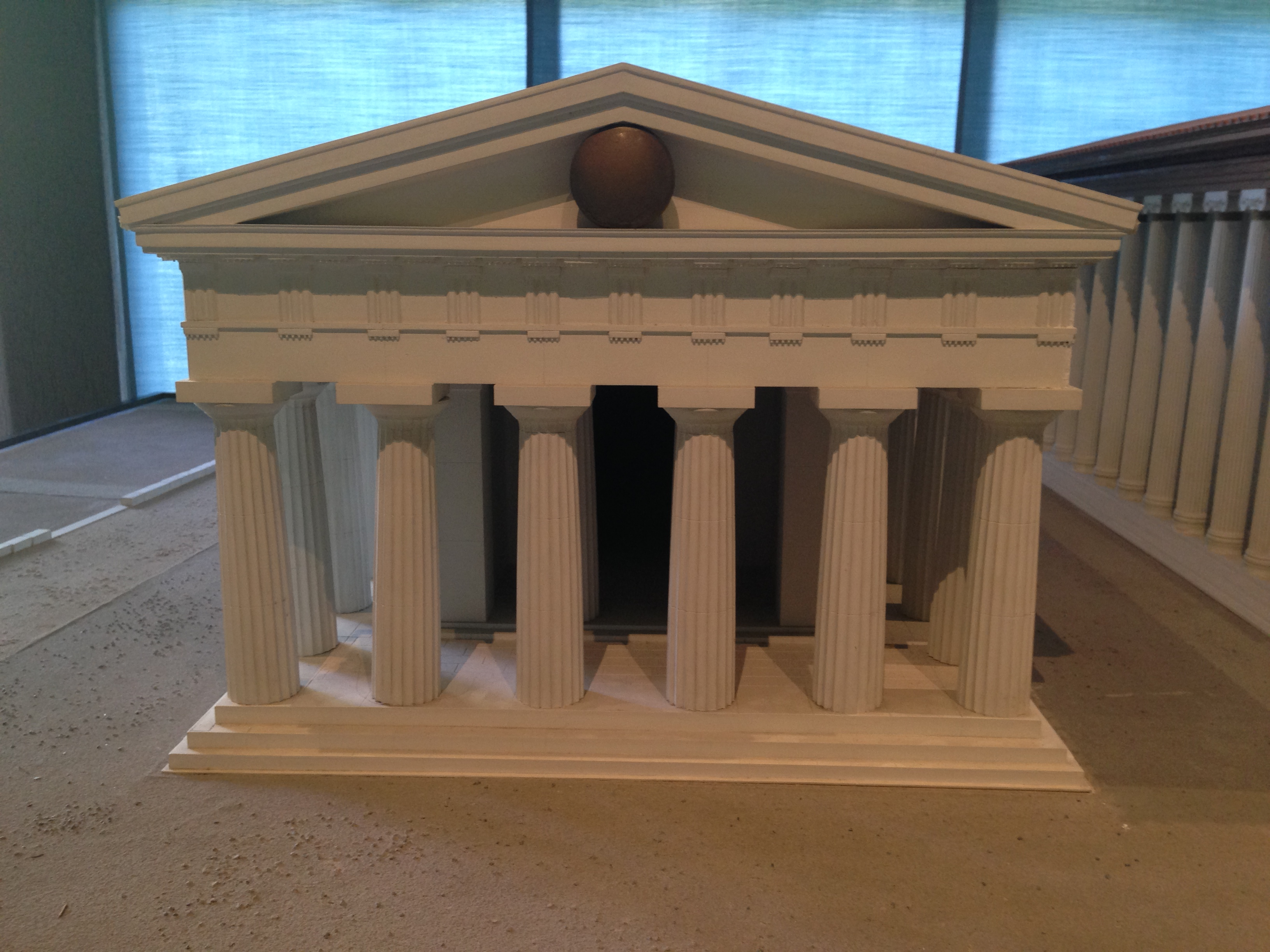
model reconstruction of the temple's Doric façade

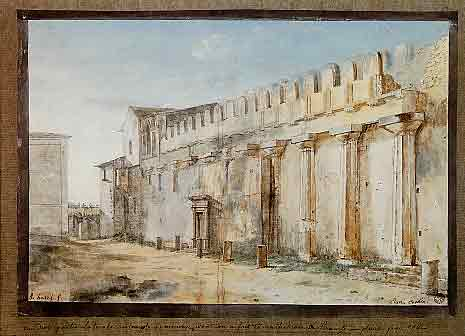
Watercolor by French travel writer Jean-Pierre Houël circa 1776

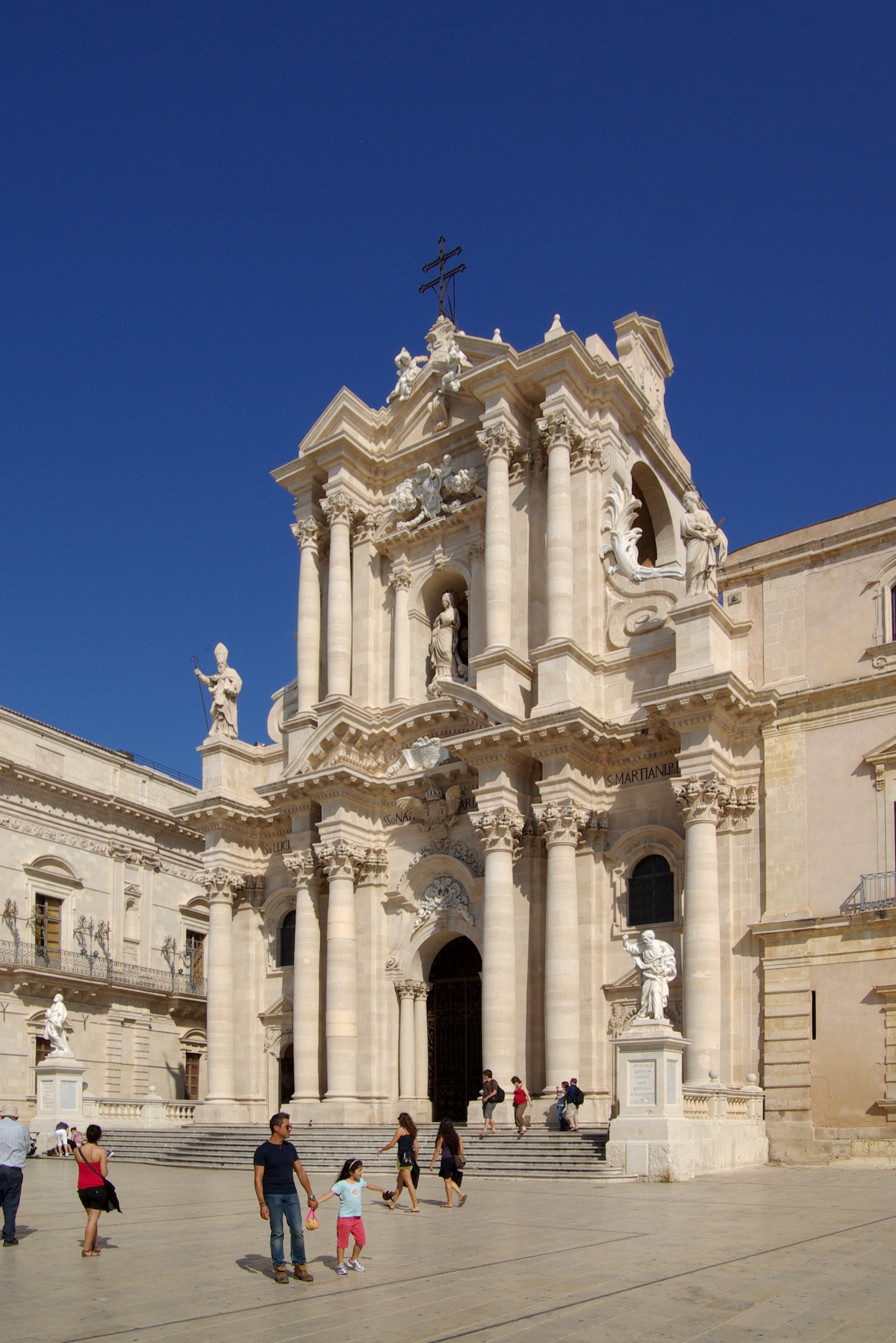
Façade

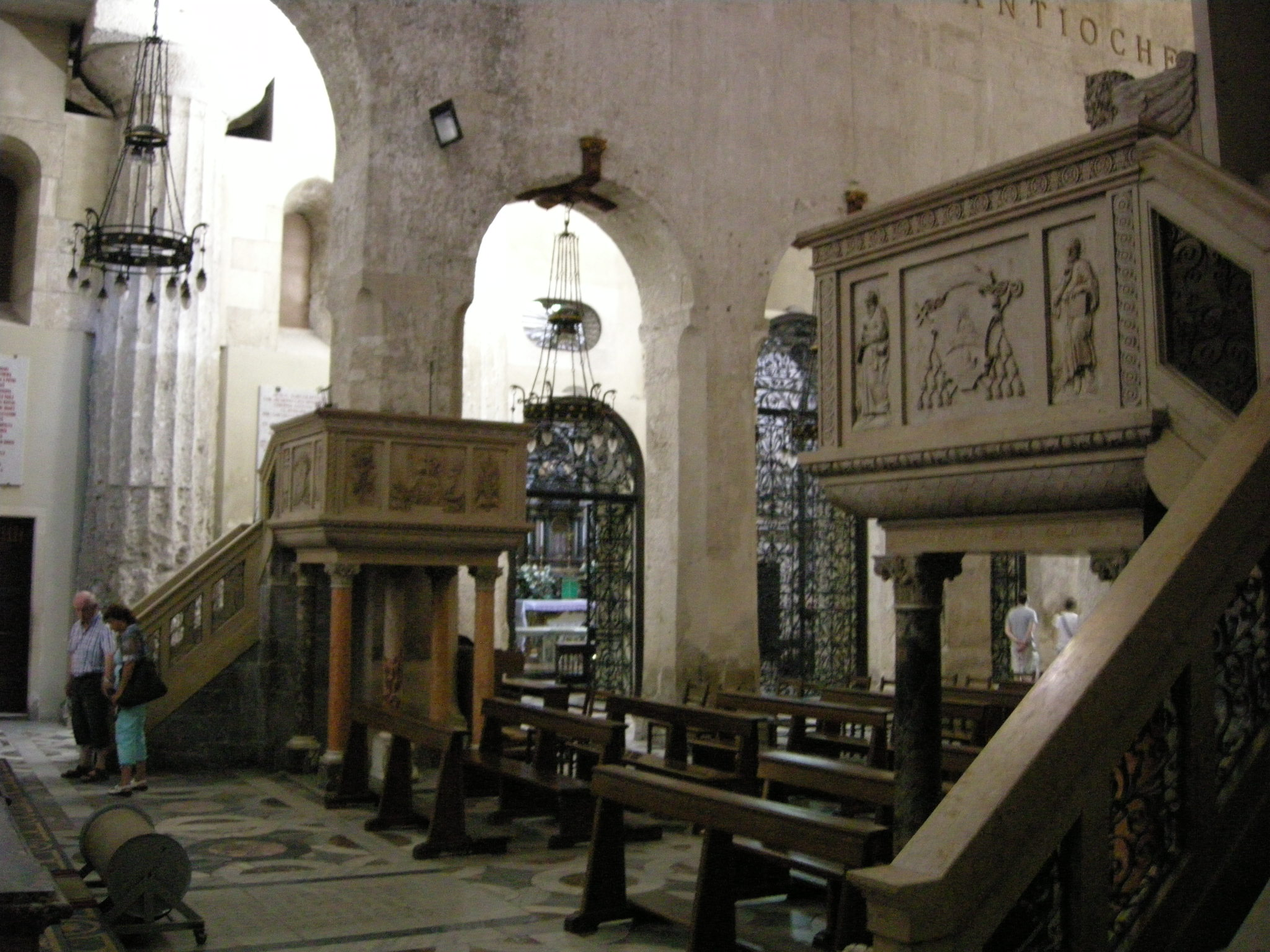
Interior, pulpit

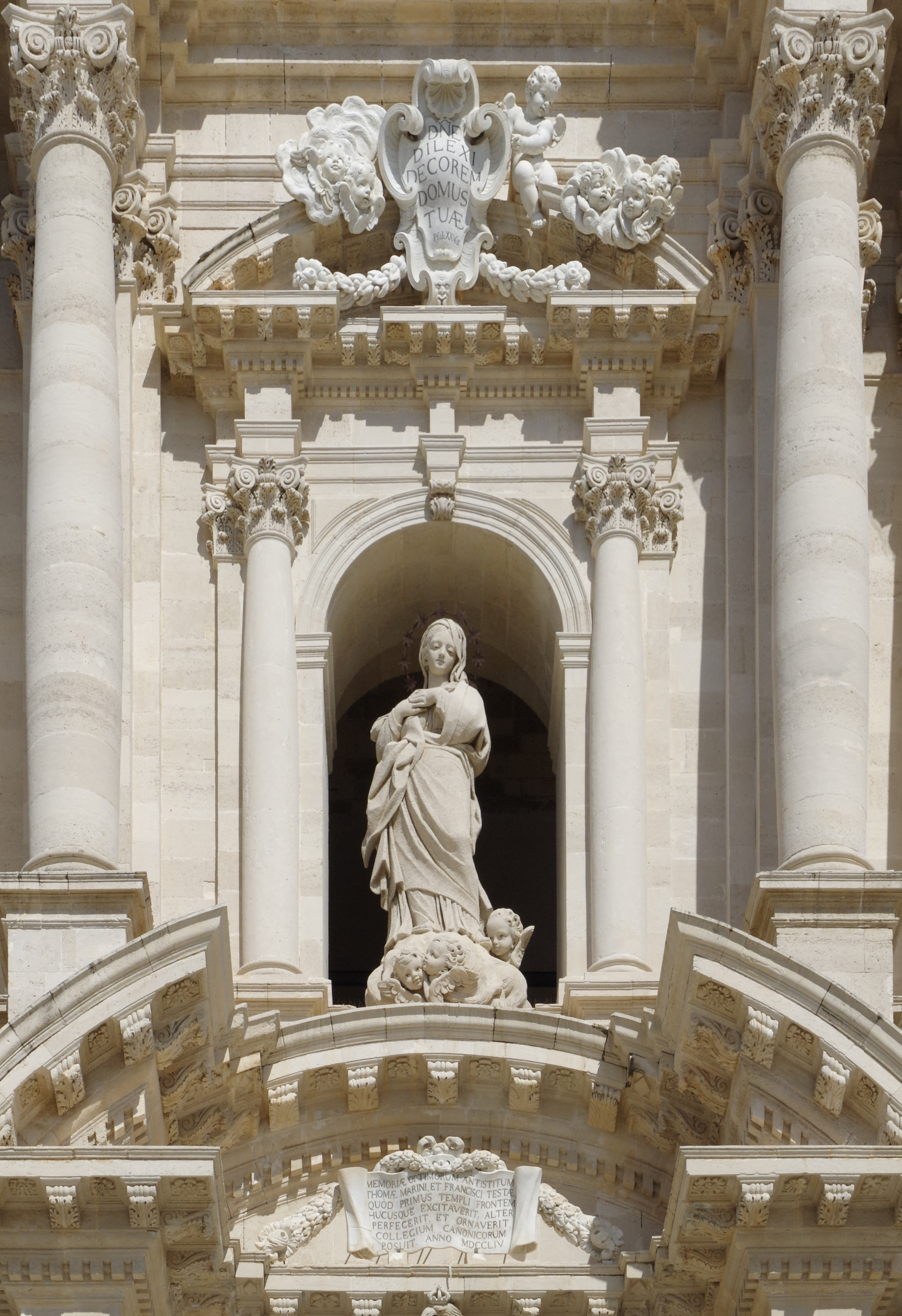
Marabitti, statue of the Virgin

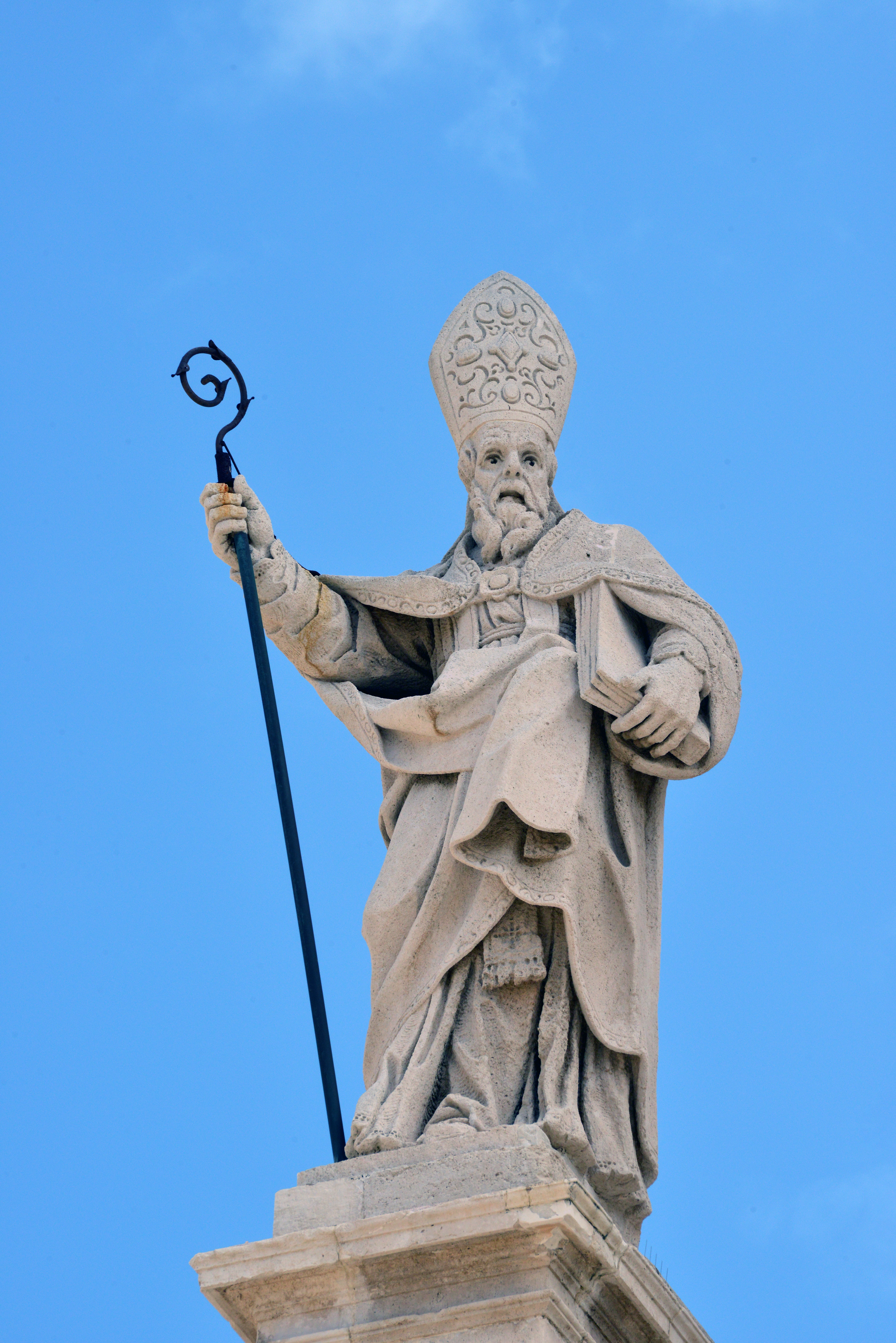
Saint Paul on the façade of the Cathedral of Syracuse.

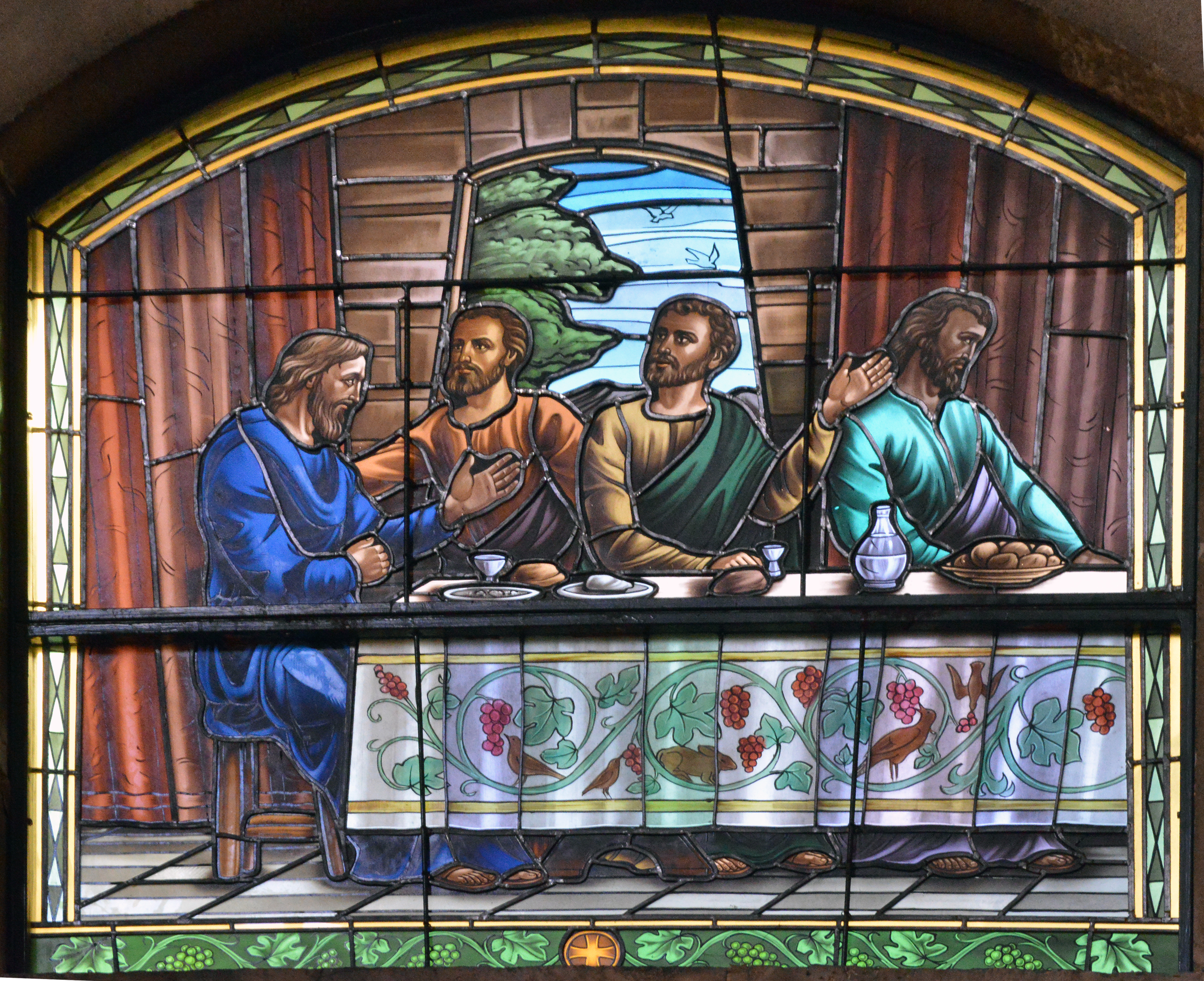
Stained glass window of the St Lucia chapel, Cathedral of Syracuse

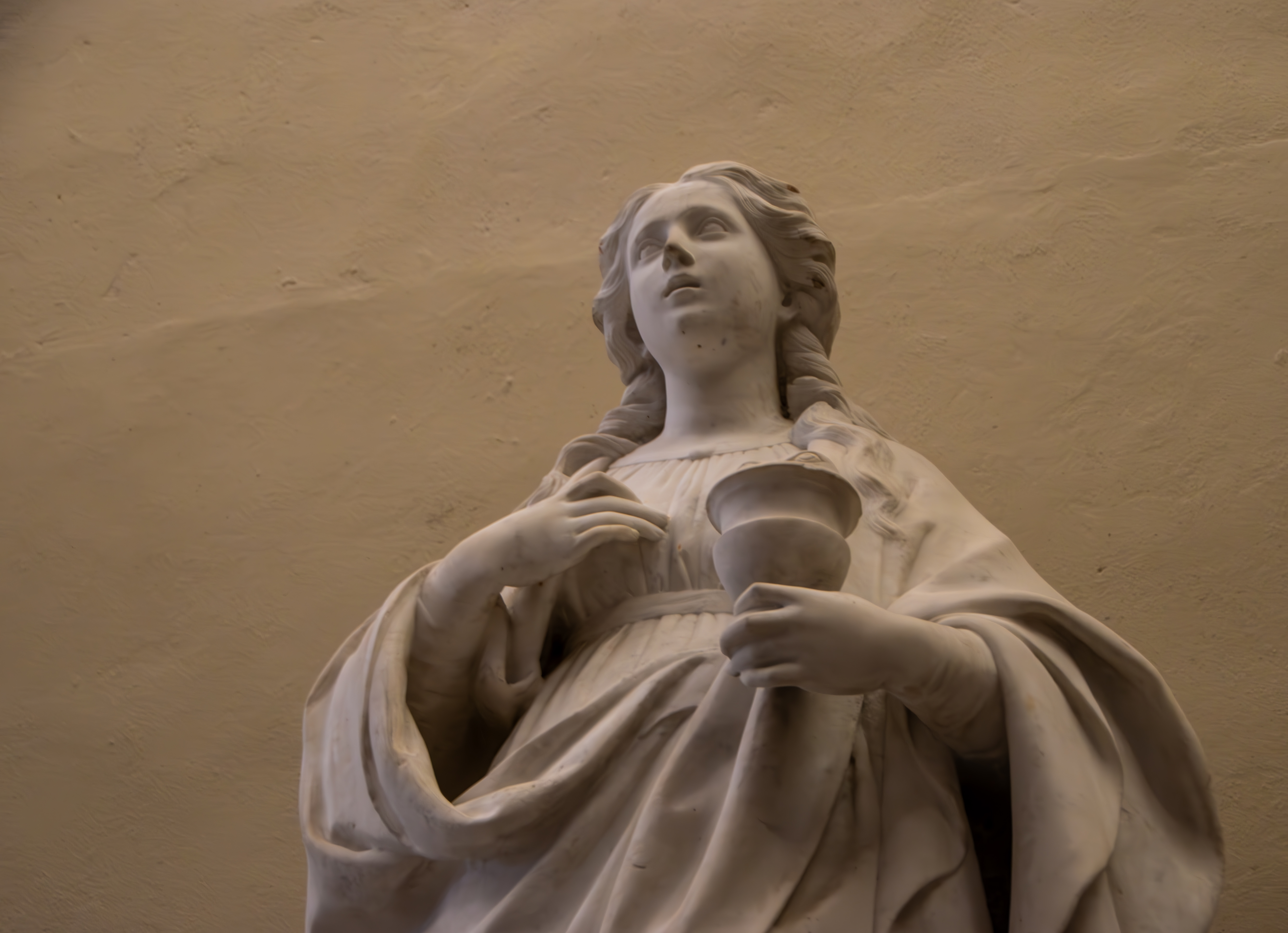
Antonello Gagini's Statue of Saint Lucy

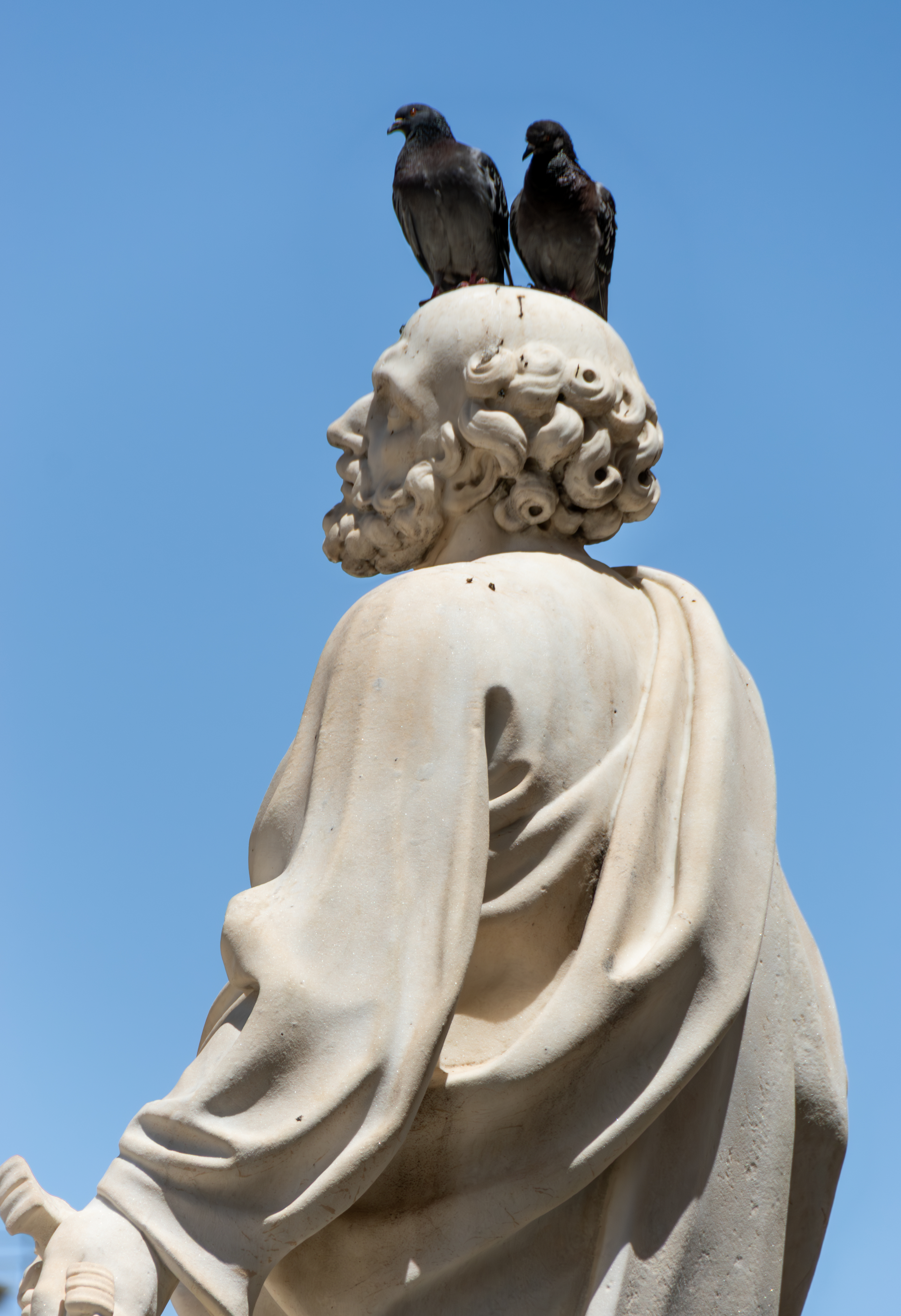
Pigeons Resting on the Statue of Saint Peter by Ignazio Marabitti
