= Fontana del Genio a Villa Giulia =

Coordinates: 38°06′47″N 13°22′28″E

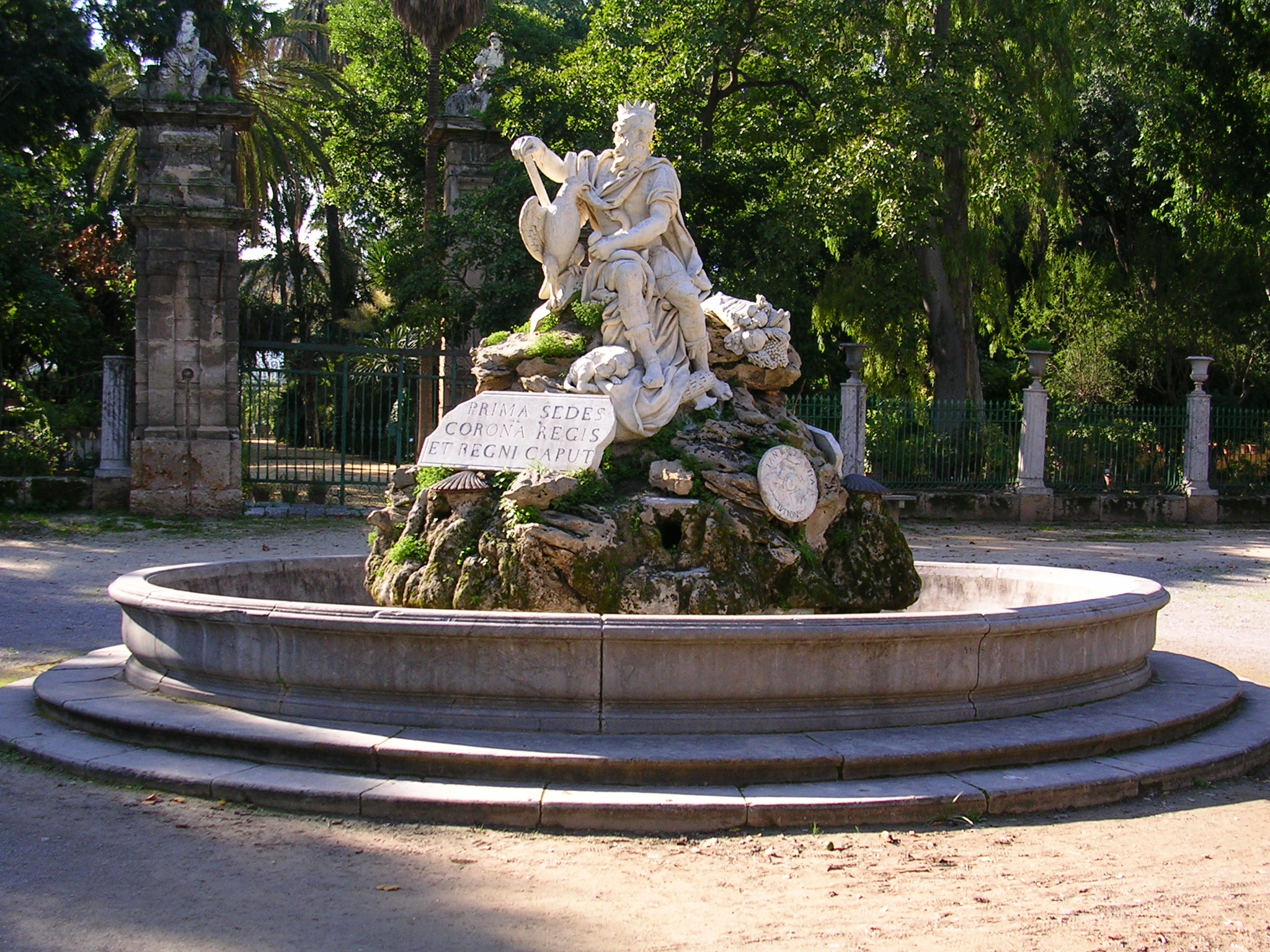
Fontana del Genio a Villa Giulia by Ignazio Marabitti.

The Fontana del Genio a Villa Giulia or Genio di Villa Giulia is a sculpted water fountain in the park of the Villa Giulia in Palermo. It was sculpted by Ignazio Marabitti in 1778 and shows the Genius of Palermo.
