= The Four Seasons (Sozzi) =

Cycle of four frescoes by Francesco Sozzi

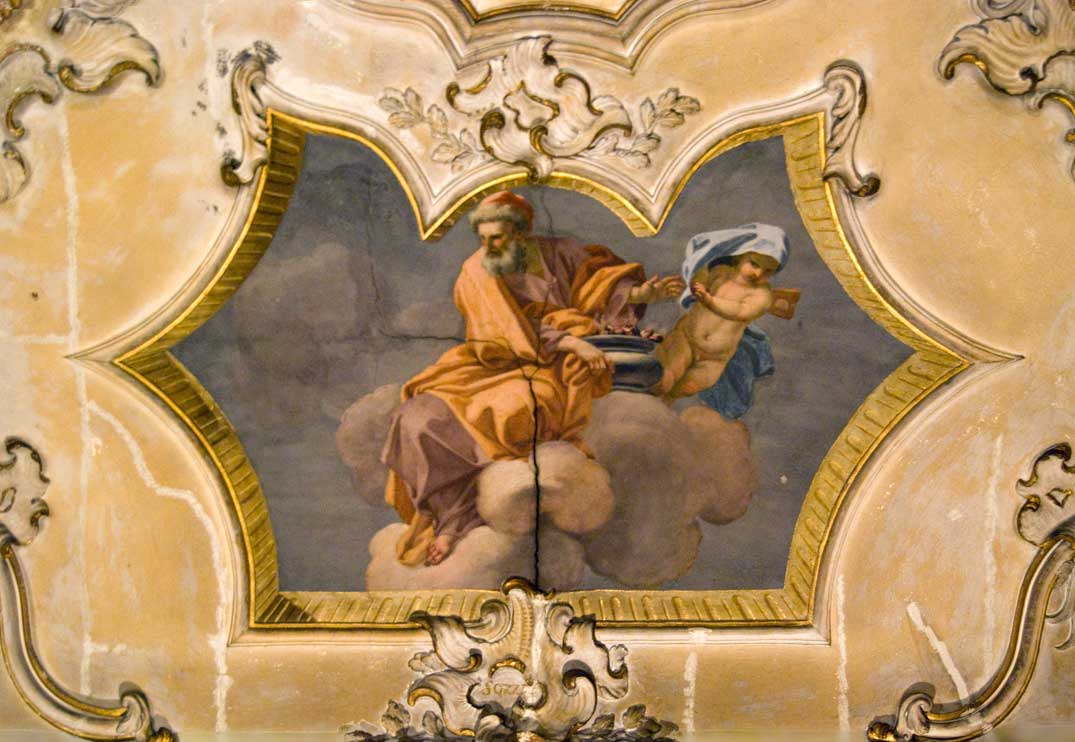
- Winter, detail
- Artist: Francesco Sozzi
- Year: 1760
- Type: Fresco cycle
- Location: Palazzo Isnello; Palermo

The Four Seasons (Le Quattro Stagioni it) is a cycle of four frescoes by Francesco Sozzi in the Palazzo Isnello, Palermo, Italy.

== Description and history ==
The cycle, completed in 1760, was painted on the Four Seasons Hall vault of the Counts of Isnello palazzo's. It is a graceful example of Palermitan Rococo, that is, late-Sicilian Baroque, fresco cycles. The four paintings are framed in butterfly wing shape, decorative solution adopted at Palazzo Isnello. Among the gilded stucco decoration of the vault there is the artist signature, dated 1760 in golden characters.

In the four allegorical paintings each of the seasons is represented by the image of a deity: Venus represents spring, Ceres, summer; Bacchus, autumn; and finally Aeolus represents winter.

== Images ==
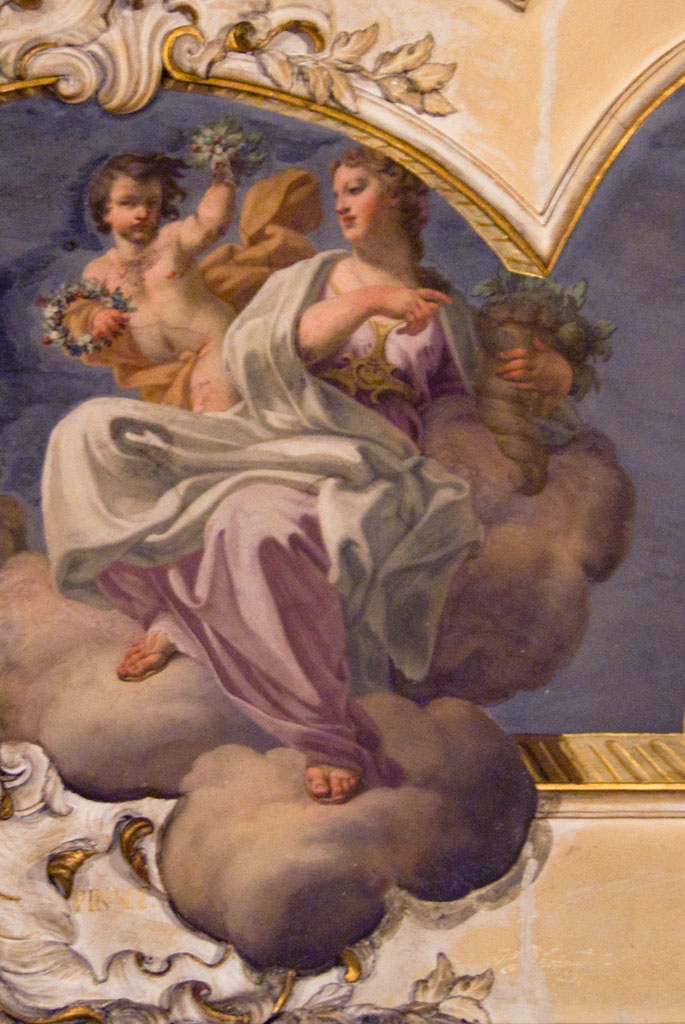
The Spring personified by Venus.

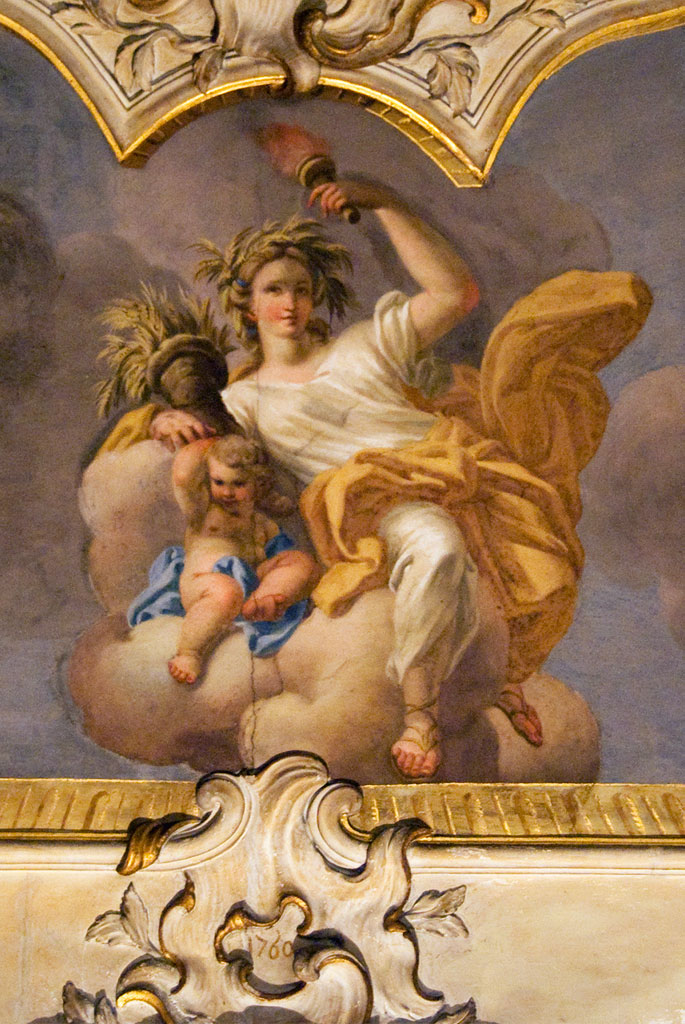
The Summer, personified by Ceres.

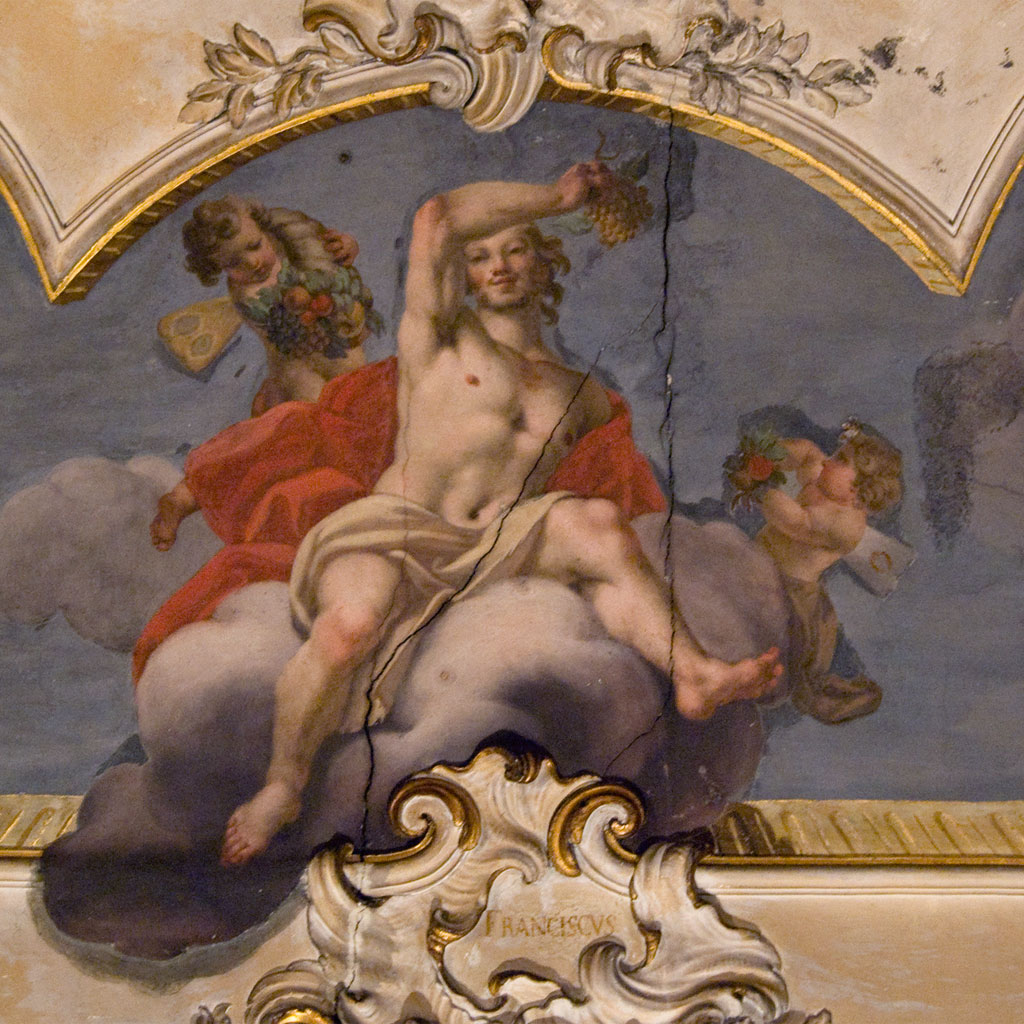
The Autumn, personified by Dionysus.

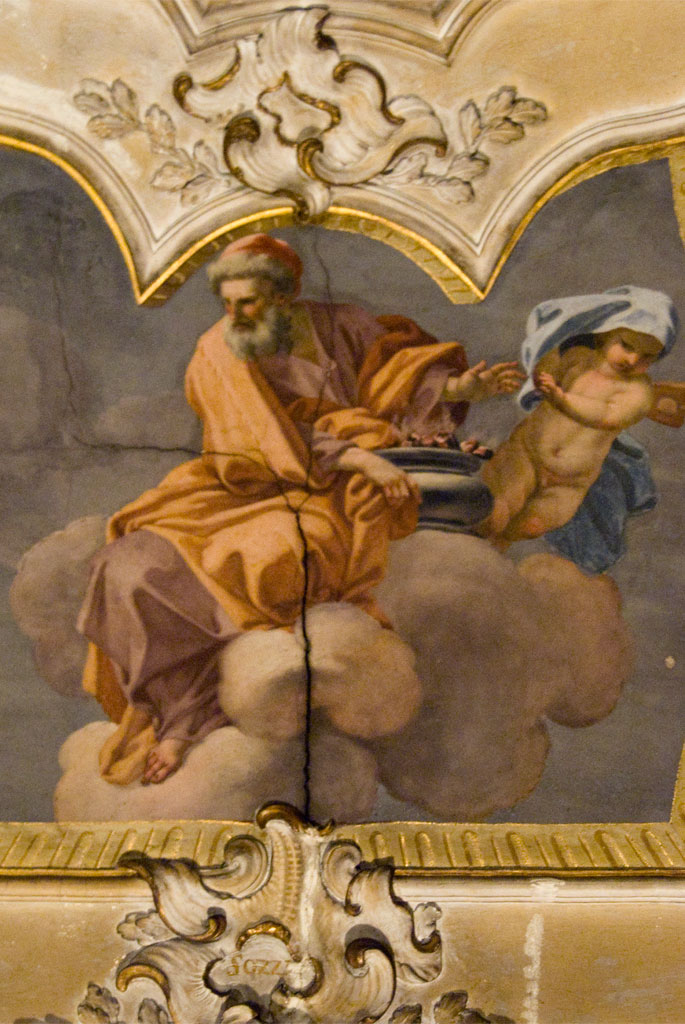
The Winter, personified by Aeolus.
