= Apotheosis of Palermo =

Fresco by Vito D'Anna

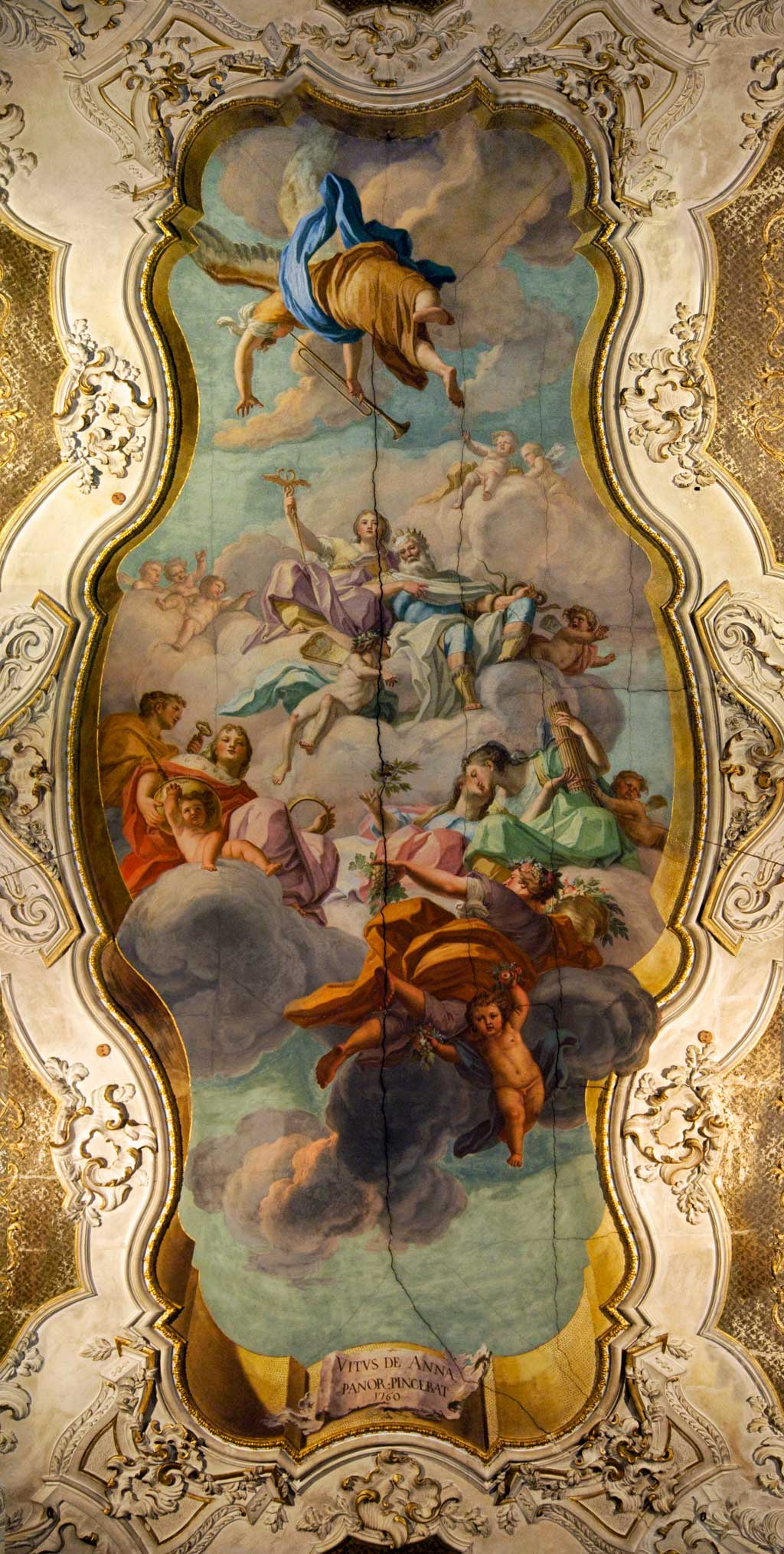
- Artist: Vito D'Anna
- Year: 1760
- Type: Fresco
- Dimensions: 860 cm × 340 cm (340 in × 130 in)
- Location: Palazzo Isnello; Palermo

The Apotheosis of Palermo is a fresco by Vito D'Anna in the Palazzo Isnello, Palermo, Italy, considered one of the most representative works of the Sicilian Baroque painting.

It is one of the seven monumental representations of the Genius of Palermo.

== Description ==
The fresco is an allegory representing the apotheosis of the city of Palermo, personified by the Genius of Palermo, numen protector of the city, surrounded by allegorical figures of Fame, Justice, Abundance, and other mythological figures.

The painting, signed and dated 1760 by Vito D'Anna, is on the piano nobile of Palazzo Isnello, on the vault of the ballroom.

== See also ==
- Rococo
