= Ignazio Marabitti =

Italian sculptor

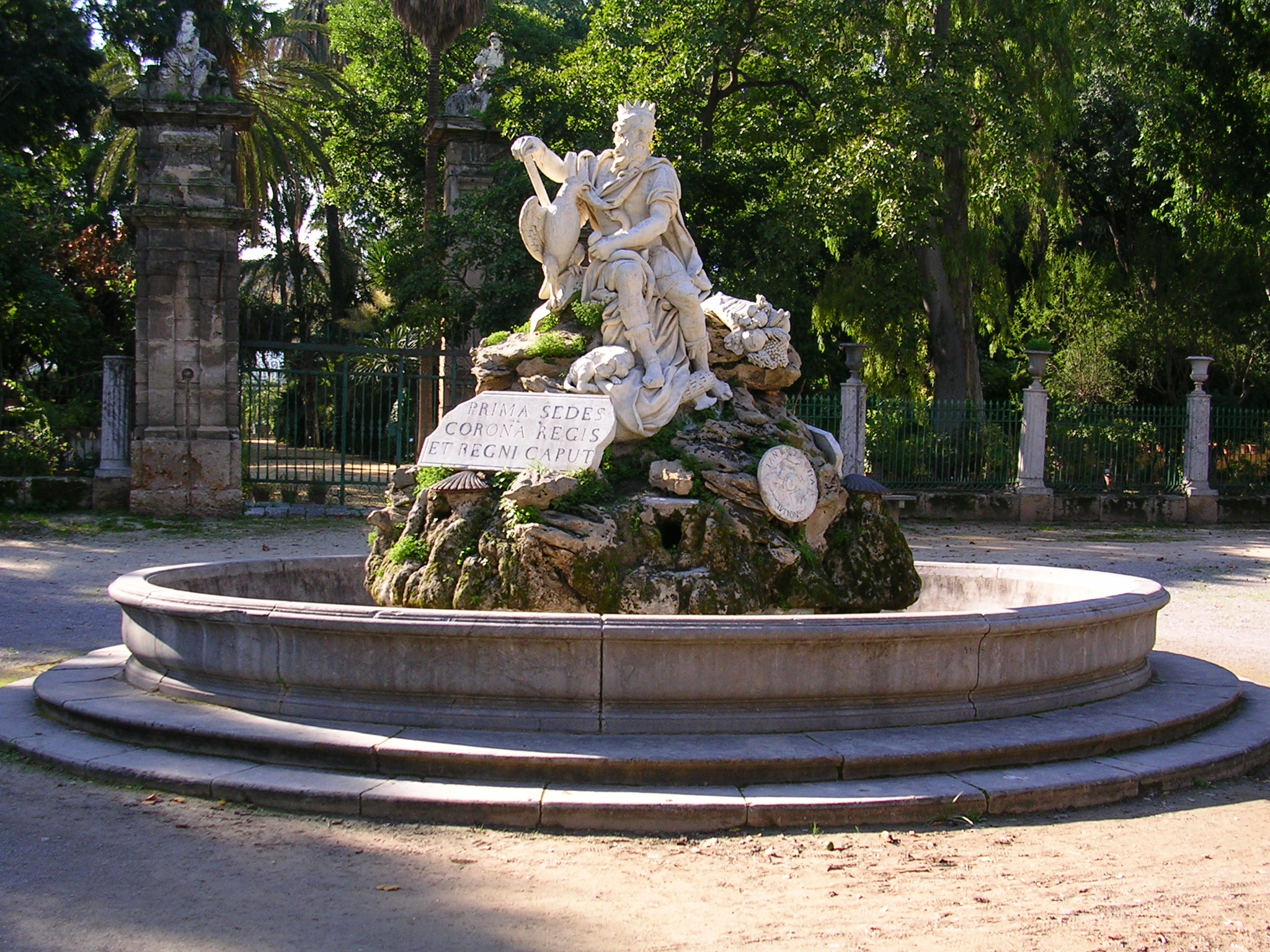
Fountain of the Genius of Palermo

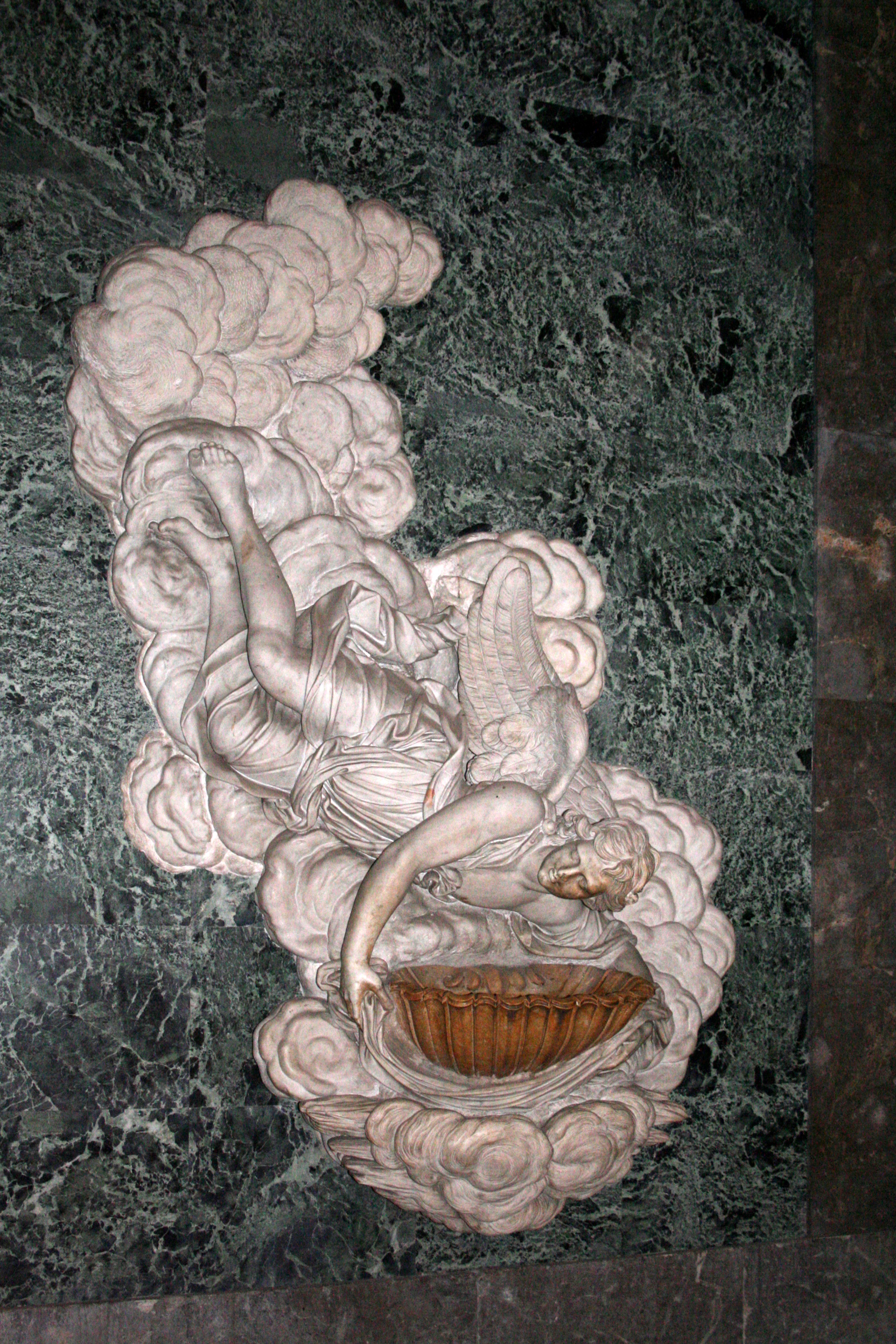
Holy water font for the church of San Giuseppe dei Teatini in Palermo.

Ignazio Marabitti (6 September 1719 in Palermo – 1797 in Palermo) was a Sicilian sculptor of the late Baroque period.

He trained in Rome in the studio of Filippo della Valle, head of the Accademia di San Luca, but was mainly active in Sicily, where his works can be found in Siracusa, Caltanisetta, Catania, Messina, and Palermo.

Among his notable works is the Fontana del Genio a Villa Giulia, and statues on the facades of the Cathedral of Syracuse and the Cathedral of Palermo.
