= Genius of Palermo =

Personification of the Sicilian city

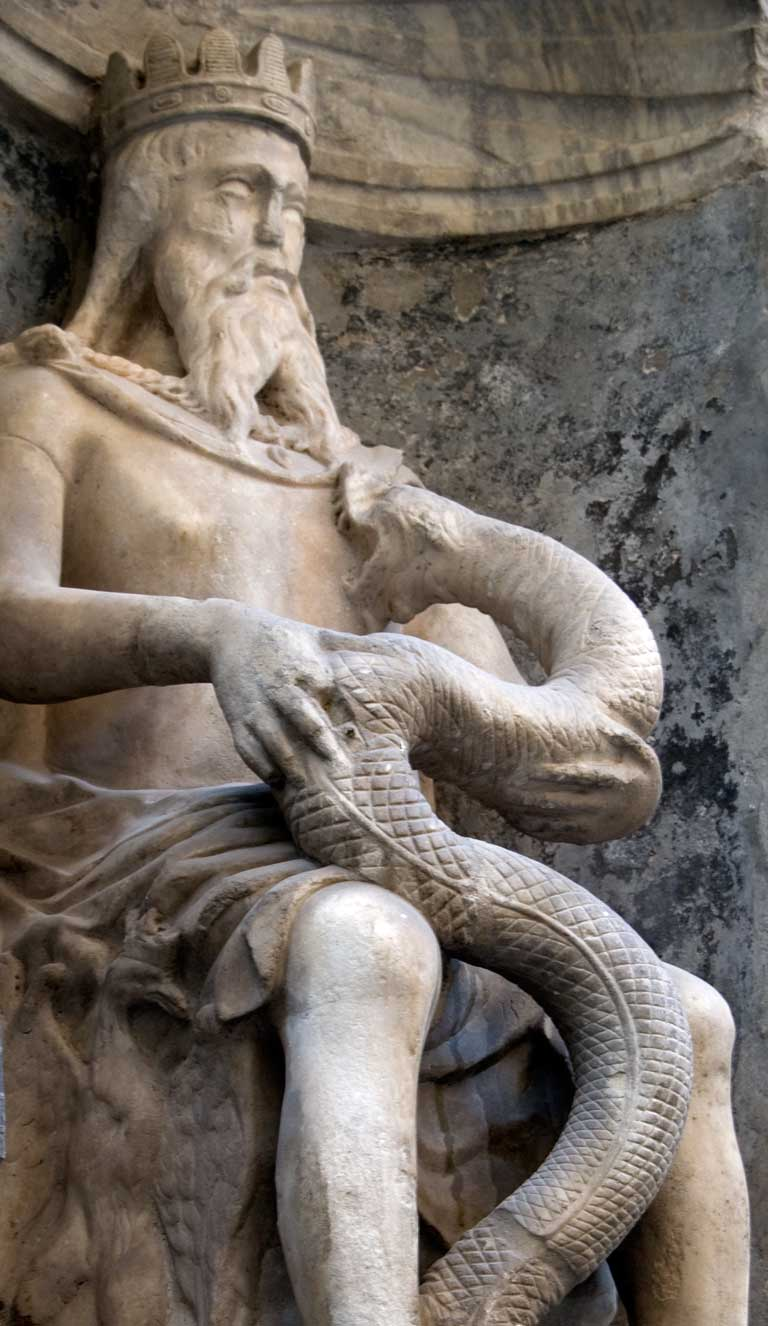
Palermu lu Grandi (1483), one of seven monumental representations of the Genius of Palermo.

The Genius of Palermo (in Italian Genio di Palermo, also called Genio or Palermo) is one of the city symbols and the lay patron of Palermo. He was the ancient numen and genius loci of the Sicilian city.

The Genius is the emblem of Palermo, the personification of the city, and symbol of its inhabitants. Its origins are probably pre-Roman, but there is no accepted archetype of this legendary and mysterious patron deity. According to the myths passed down from Ovid in the first century it symbolizes the genius loci, or the metamorphosis of an animal spirit into a masculine figure.

The snake symbolizes Scipio Africanus, who was helped by Palermo in the war against the Carthaginians of Hannibal. In gratitude, Scipio is said to have gifted the city with a golden basin, with a central statue of a warrior with a serpent feeding on his chest. The symbol of the serpent may have more than one meaning: it is linked to land and water, fertility, rebirth and renewal. The snake is also a symbol of prudence, antagonist of the sun, and bearer of knowledge related to physical force. In addition to the serpent, the symbology of the Genius also include a crown, a scepter and a dog.

In 1400 the leaders of Palermo adopted the image of the Genius as part of the city seal.

The Genius of Fieravecchia, also called the Genius of Revolution Square, took on a new role during the riots of 1848, becoming the symbol of the desire for freedom and emancipation of Palermo from Bourbon rule: in that time the people in revolt gathered around the statue, and draped it in the flag in protest. Personifying the ideals of the city, the Genius took on a role as a lay patron, complementary to that of Santa Rosalia.

«Panormus conca aurea suos devorat alienos nutrit» (Palermo the golden dell, devours hers and feeds the foreigners. Latin inscription on the edge of the basin of the Genius statue at City Hall of Palermo.)

== See also ==
- Apotheosis of Palermo
- Genius
- Saint Rosalia
