= Santa Teresa alla Kalsa =

Roman Catholic church in Palermo, Italy

Church of Saint Teresa
- Chiesa di Santa Teresa alla Kalsa (in Italian)
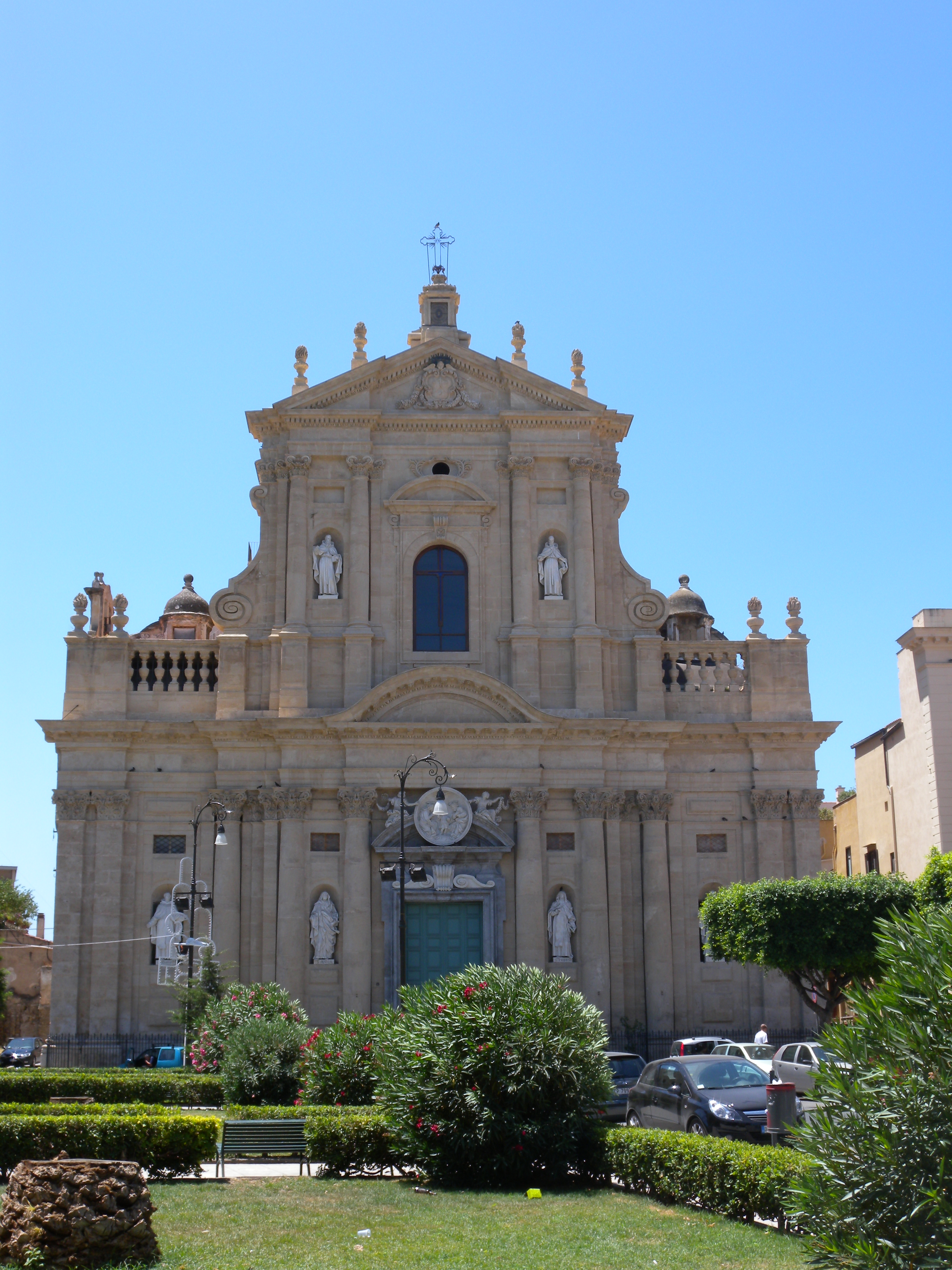
- Facade of the church

Religion
- Affiliation: Roman Catholic
- Province: Archdiocese of Palermo
- Rite: Roman Rite
- Year consecrated: 2021

Location
- Location: Palermo, Italy
- Interactive map of Church of Saint Teresa
- Coordinates: 38°06′56.88″N 13°22′21.72″E

Architecture
- Architect: Giacomo Amato
- Style: Sicilian Baroque
- Groundbreaking: 1686
- Completed: 1700

The Church of Saint Teresa (Italian: Chiesa di Santa Teresa or Santa Teresa alla Kalsa) is a Baroque Roman Catholic church, located on Piazza della Kalsa, facing the Porta de Greci (now Palazzo Forcella de Seta) in the ancient quarter of the Kalsa of the city of Palermo, region of Sicily, Italy.

== History ==
A monastery, and church, under the discalced Carmelite nuns under the rule of Saint Teresa of Avila were patronized in the first quarter of the 17th century by the then Duke of Montalto and his wife, Donna Maria, Princess of Paceco. In 1628, under the Cardinal Archbishop Doria, permission was granted to establish a monastery. The next year, Pope Urban VIII also gave his approval. The initial monastery was located near Porta Carini, near the Monastery of the Concezione. But this latter monastery opposed the construction of this competitor, and a new site was chosen near Porta Mazzara. The first nuns were from the Monastery of San Giuseppe of Naples, and traveled under cloistered supervision to Palermo in a galley. Received by the Princess of Paceco and the Cardinal Archbishop Francesco la Ribba, they were disembarked and installed in their cloistered setting. But this monastery proved uncomfortable, and the Prioress Maria Maddalena di San Agostino (al secolo, Cecilia Fardella e Paceco), sister of Donna Maria, supervised a move in 1653 to a site with the former palace of Vincenzo Gambacurta, near Porta de Greci. The initial church was simple and by 1686, plans were made to erect the present church. The church was designed by the Palermitan architect Giacomo Amato and was completed by 1700. It was consecrated in 1711 by Don Bartolomeo Castelli, bishop of Mazzara and brother of the then prioress.

== Art and Architecture ==
The facade has two orders of columns, set on high plinths. In this, it recalls the facade of a church, four blocks north and also on Via Terramuzzo: Santa Maria della Pietà, also designed by the same architect Amato. However the uniformity of stone, give this facade a more muted neoclassical style.

Above the main portal is a round 17th-century bas-relief depicting the Holy Family with the Holy Spirit, sculpted by Cristoforo Milanti. Inside, the first chapel or altar on the right, has an altarpiece depicting the Trasverberation of the Heart of St Teresa by Guglielmo Borremans. The second chapel on the left, dedicated to the Madonna of the Carmine, has a painting depicting St John of the Cross by Sebastiano Conca. The chapel of the Holy Family has an altarpiece by Giovanni Odasi. The Altar of the Crucifix has a sculpture by Ignazio Marabitti.

The presbytery is decorated with four columns of grey Billiemi marble. The main altar was originally made with semi-precious stones including agates, amethyst, and lapis-lazuli. The candelabra are gilded wood. The main altarpiece depicts the Proclamation by the Council of Ephesus in 431 of the divinity of the Madonna. Above this altarpiece is a representation of the Holy Spirit (dove) in 19 gilded rays, symbolizing the 7 graces and 12 fruits of the Holy Spirit. The altar is flanked by two stucco statues by Giacomo Serpotta and his son, depicting: St Anne (left) and St Teresa (on right with book). In the register above the statues are four paintings related to the Eucharist, including The Widow of Zareptha brings Elijah bread; the Harvest of grapes; the Blessed Ruth gathers wheat in the fields of Boaz; and the Profanation of the sacrifice.

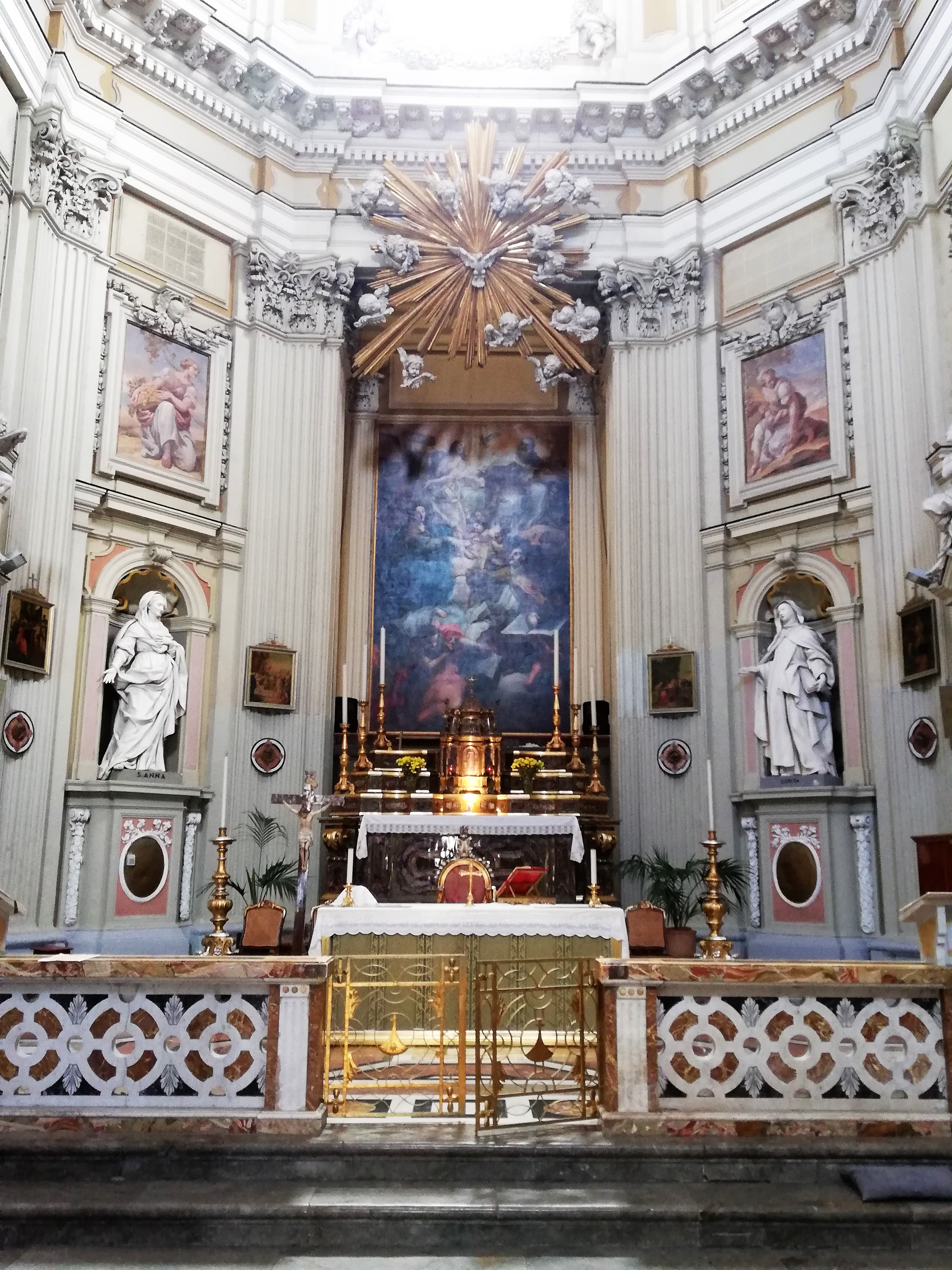
Presbytery with main altar, flanked by Saints Anne and Teresa

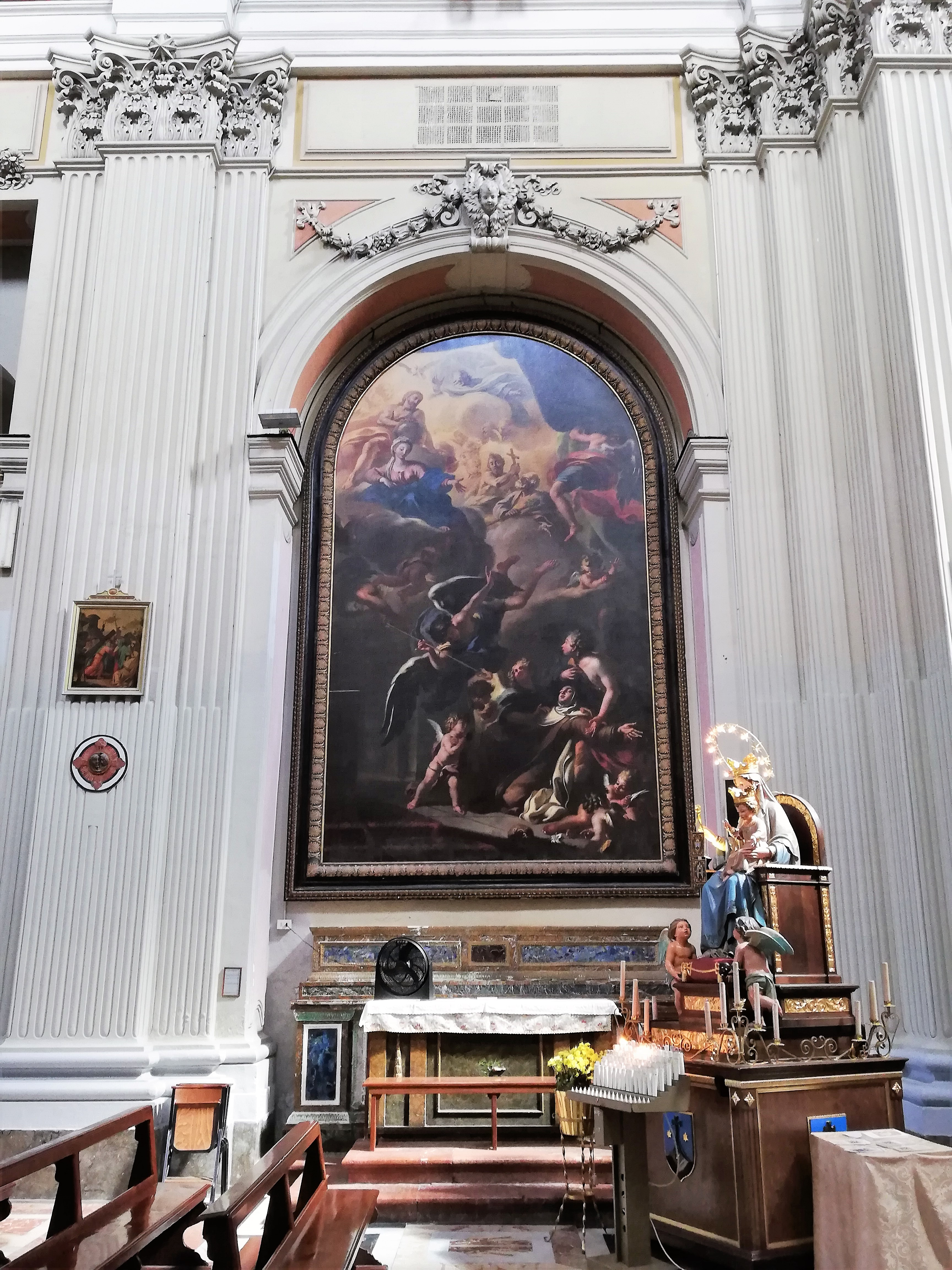
Altar of Santa Teresa with Ecstasy of St Teresa by Borremans

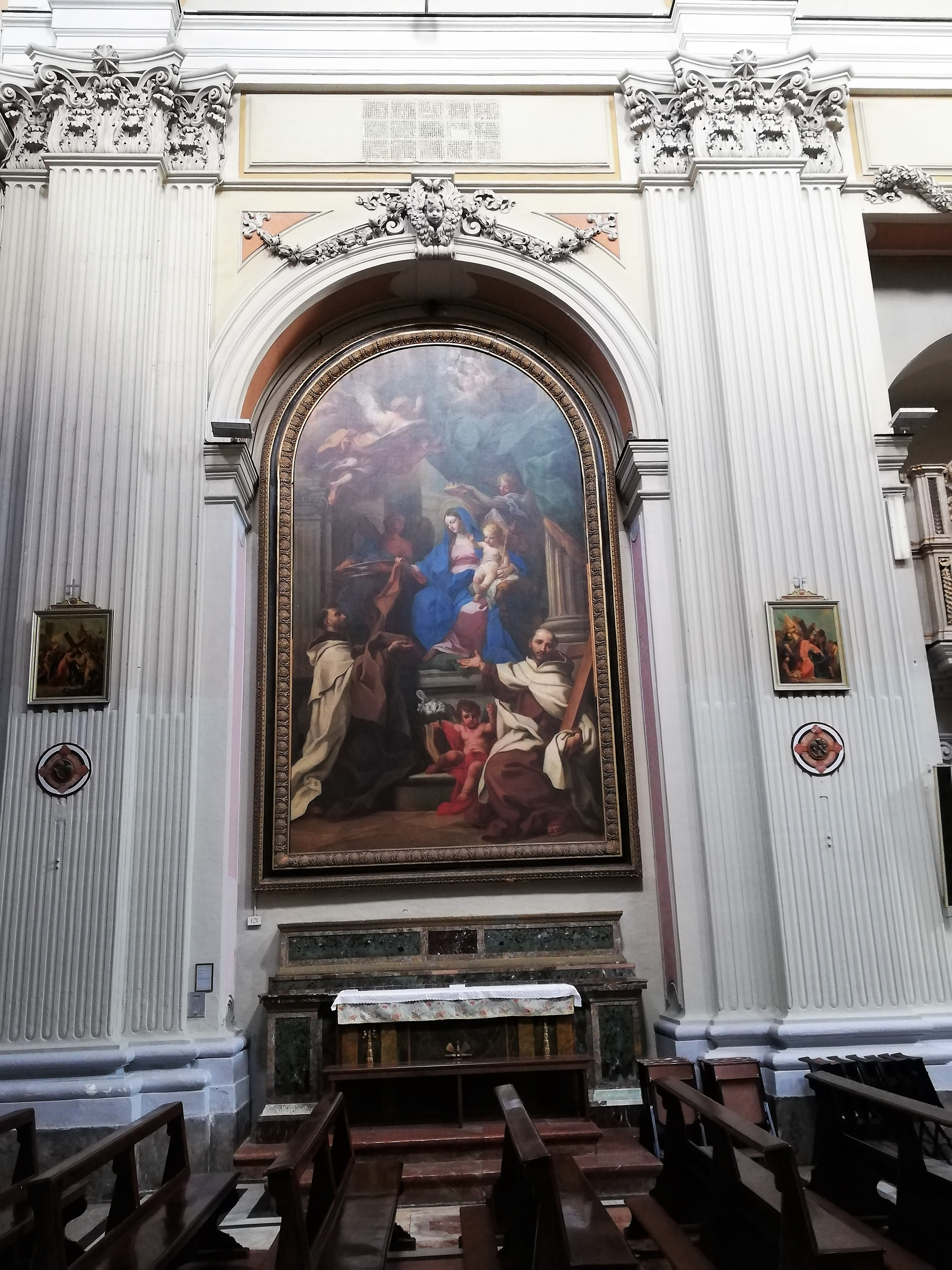
Altar of the Madonna of the Carmine with the canvas Virgin grants the scapular to St Simon Stock by Conca

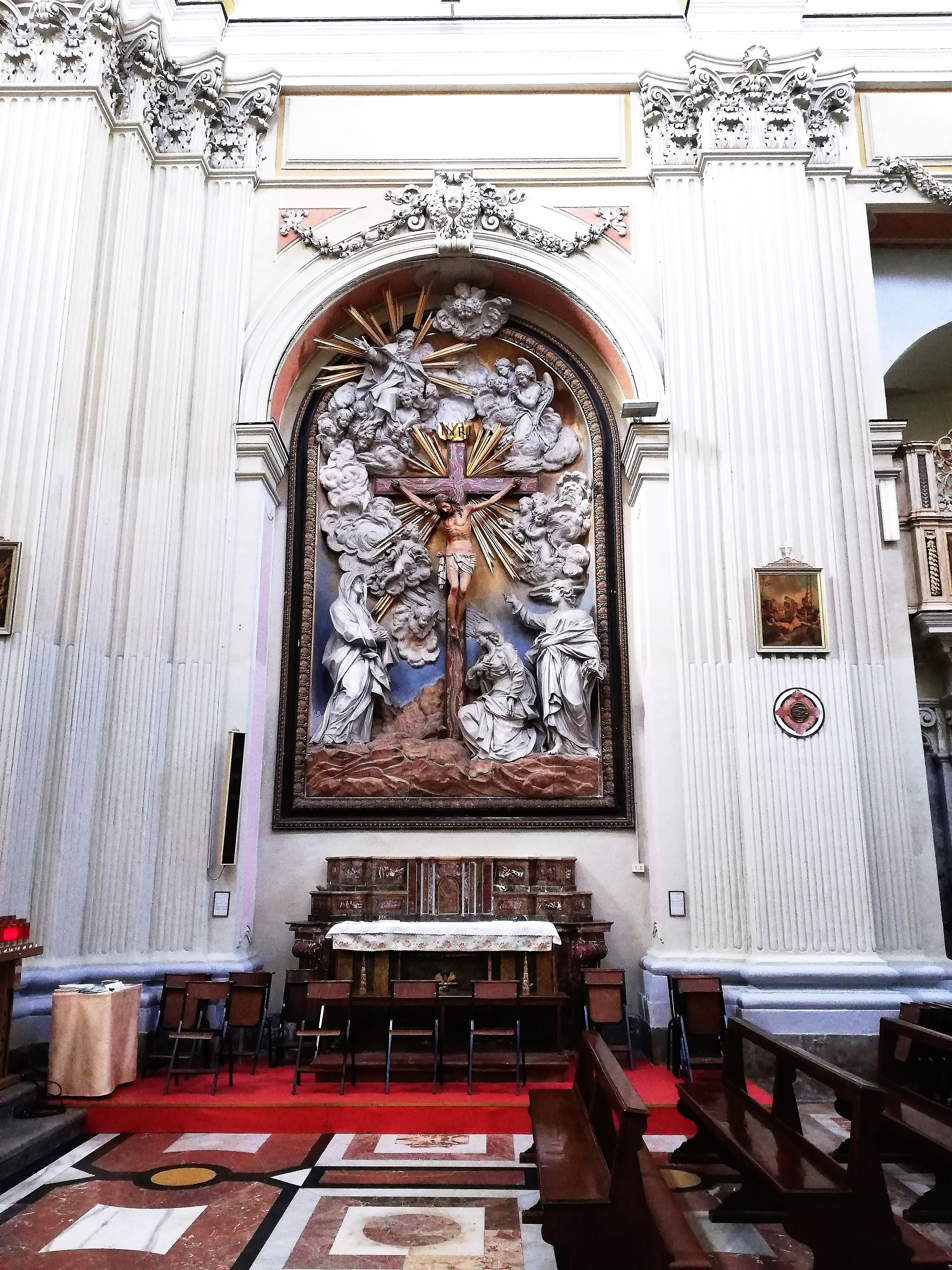
Altar of the Crucifixion with marble sculptures by Marabitti
