= Piazza Marina =

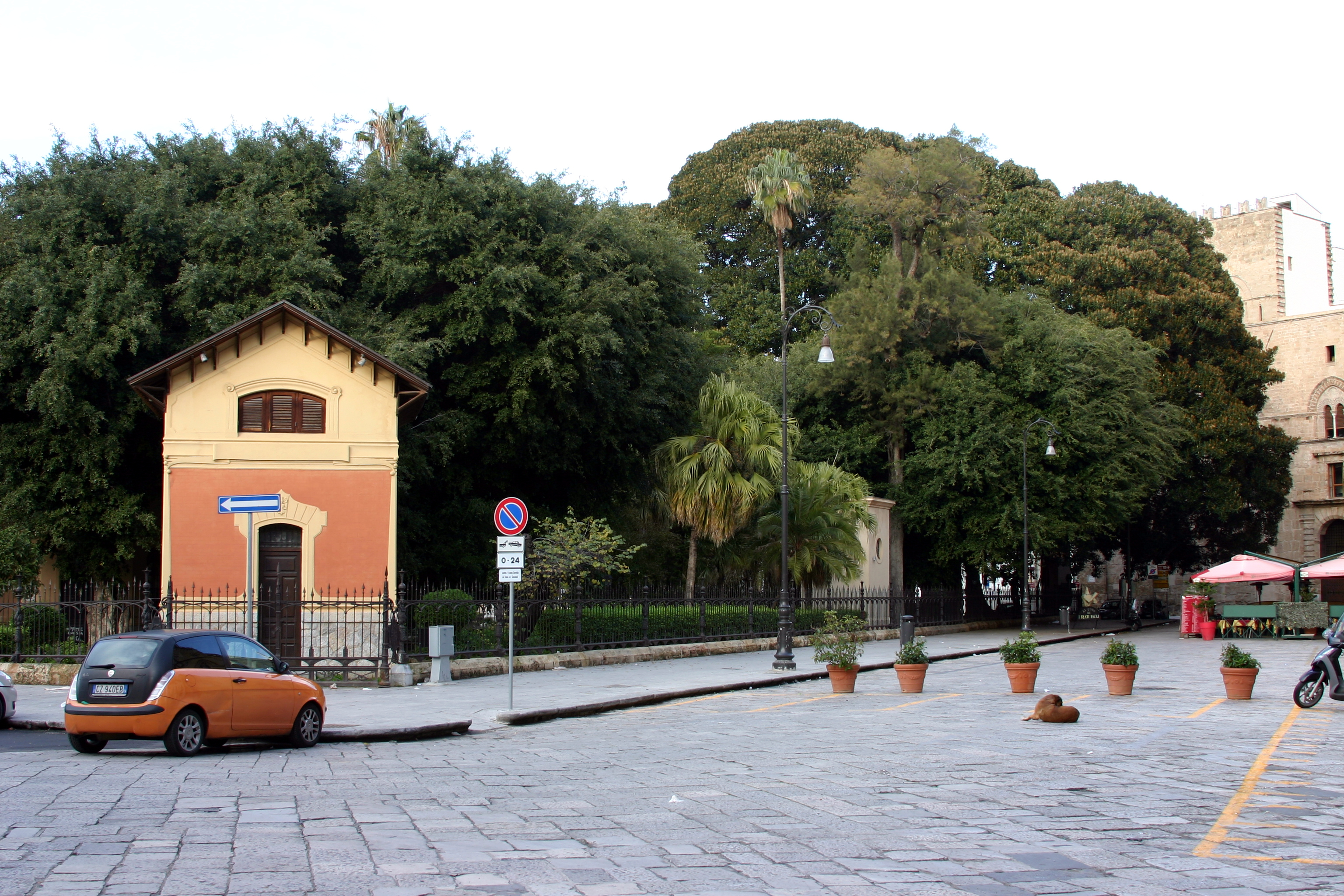
- Piazza Marina, Giardino Garibaldi
- Interactive map of Piazza Marina
- Location: Palermo, Sicily, Italy
- Coordinates: 38°07′2″N 13°22′6″E

Piazza Marina is a square of Palermo. It is located down the Cassaro street, in the quarter of the Kalsa, within the historic centre of Palermo. The square is dominated by the great Garibaldi Garden.

== History ==
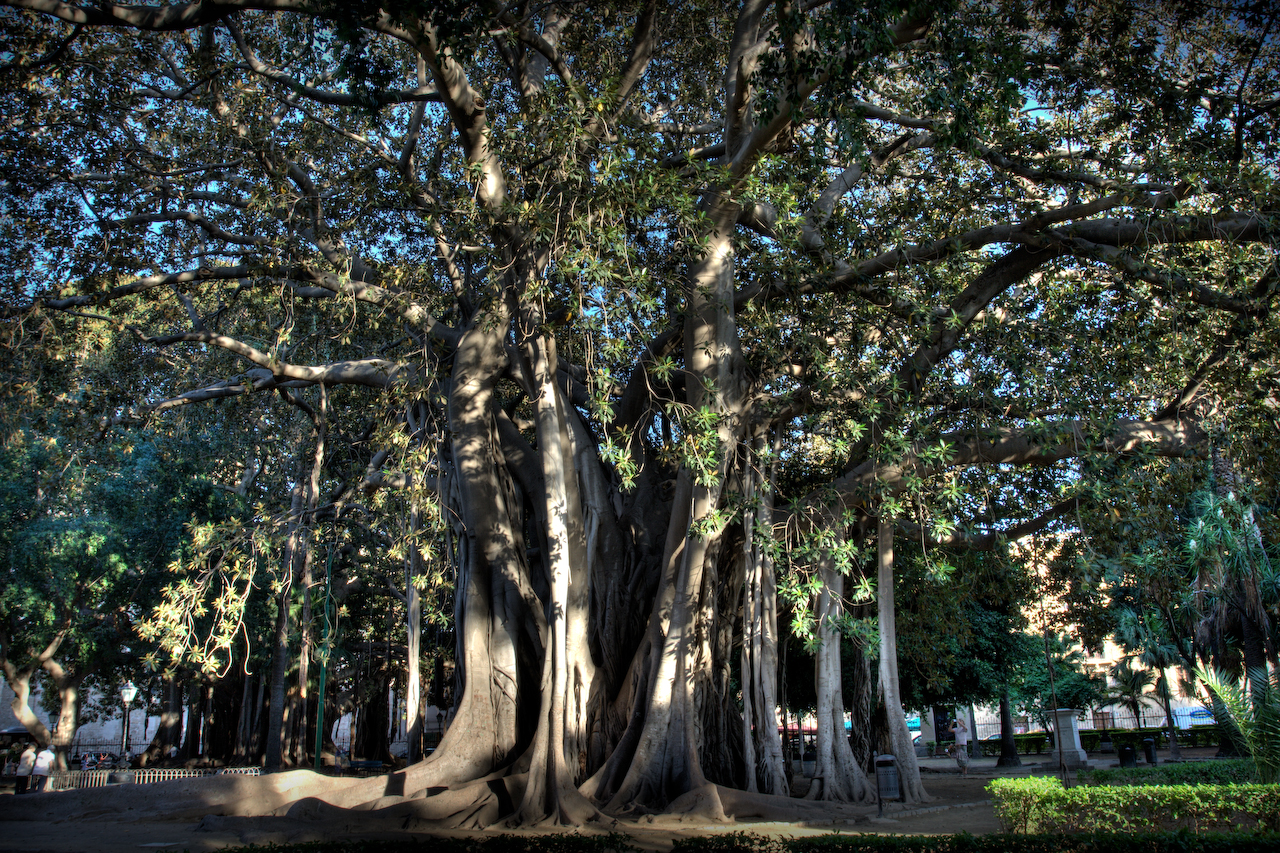
Ficus macrophylla

In the Middle Ages the area of Piazza Marina was a swamp connected to the ancient port of Palermo, the Cala. During the 14th century the area was cleared. In the Spaniard period, the space of the square was used by the Inquisition (whose headquarters was the adjacent Palazzo Chiaramonte) for its convictions.

In 1863, Giovan Battista Filippo Basile designed the Garibaldi Garden, named after national hero Giuseppe Garibaldi, at the centre of Piazza Marina. This garden is known for the presence of the biggest Ficus macrophylla in Europe. In the zone of Piazza Marina are also located several buildings like Palazzo Chiaramonte, Palazzo Galletti di San Cataldo, Palazzo Fatta, Palazzo Notarbartolo di Villarosa Dagnino, Palazzo delle Finanze, the Hotel de France, the Teatro Libero, the churches of Santa Maria dei Miracoli, San Giovanni dei Napoletani and Santa Maria della Catena and the Fontana del Garraffo.

On March 12, 1909, the New York police officer Joe Petrosino was killed in Piazza Marina during a top-secret mission against the Mafia. Later a small memorial (an engraved brass plate on a pole) was erected on the square in his remembrance.

== See also ==
- Fontana del Garraffo
- Palazzo Chiaramonte
