= Villa Filippina, Palermo =

Villa Filippina is an urban park and cultural events space in Palermo, Italy

Coordinates: 38.12072°N 13.35174°E

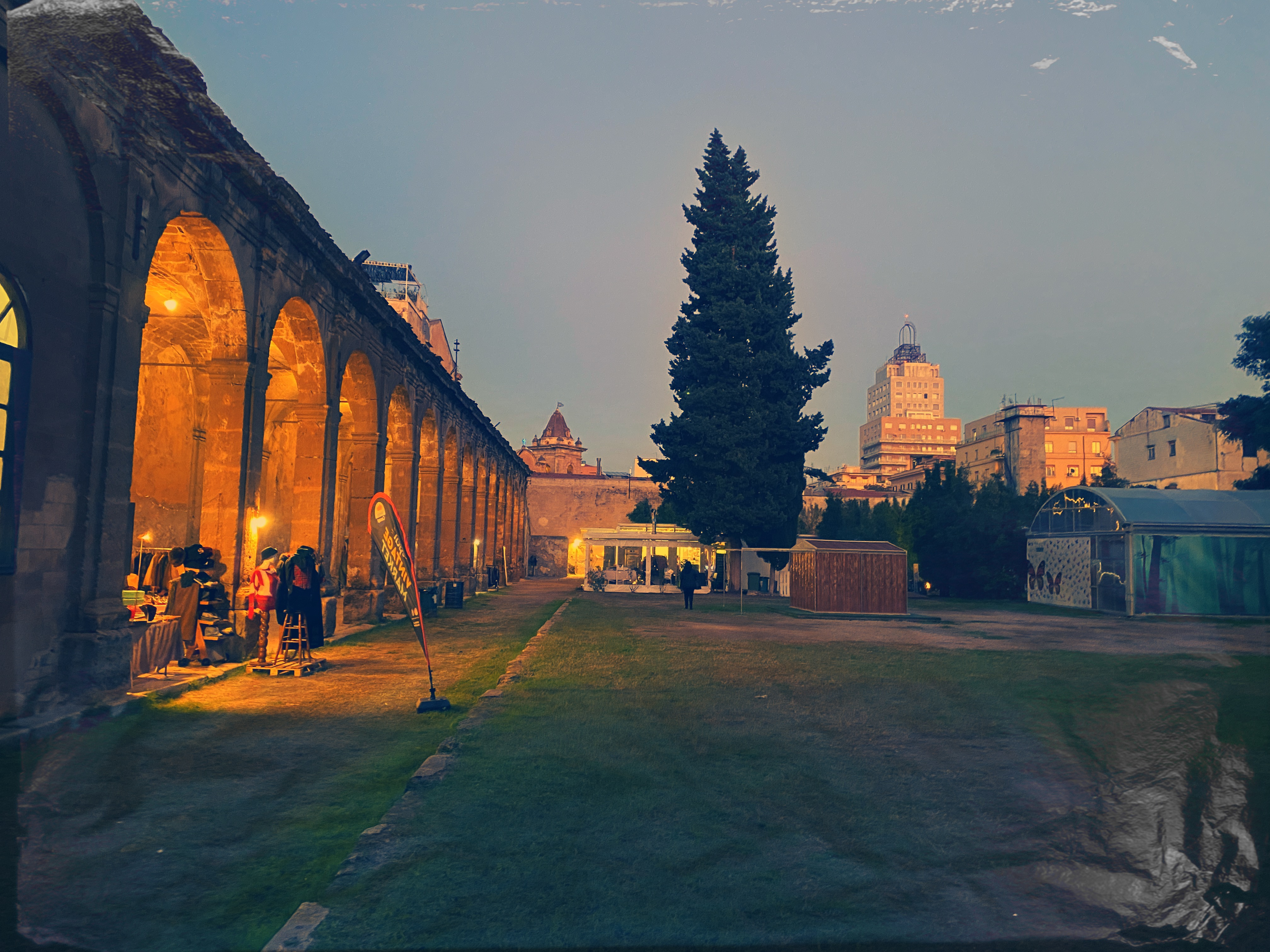
Villa Filippina

Villa Filippina is presently an urban public park and host to various cultural events, with one entrance on Via Villa Filippina, facing the park in front of San Francesco di Paola, in Palermo, region of Sicily, Italy.

== History ==
The site was conceived as a large cloister for the Oratorian order. The nearly circumvalent arcade was built between 1755-1757 under the patronage of Don Angelo Serio, who left his inheritance to the order. His portrait is sculpted on the inner side of the entrance arch. Some of the walls inside the arcade were frescoed by Vito D’Anna and Antonio Manno. In the center is a Billiemi stone fountain (1759) sculpted by Gioacchino Vitagliano, and decorated with statues of the saints Ignatius of Loyola, Felix of Cantalice, Camillo de Lellis, and Carlo Borromeo. At the start or the 20th-century, the courtyard contained a movie theater and an arena. There are presently performances in the space, with a planetarium and astronomy museum now occupying the old cinema.
