= San Francesco di Paola, Palermo =

Church building in Palermo, Italy

San Francesco di Paola
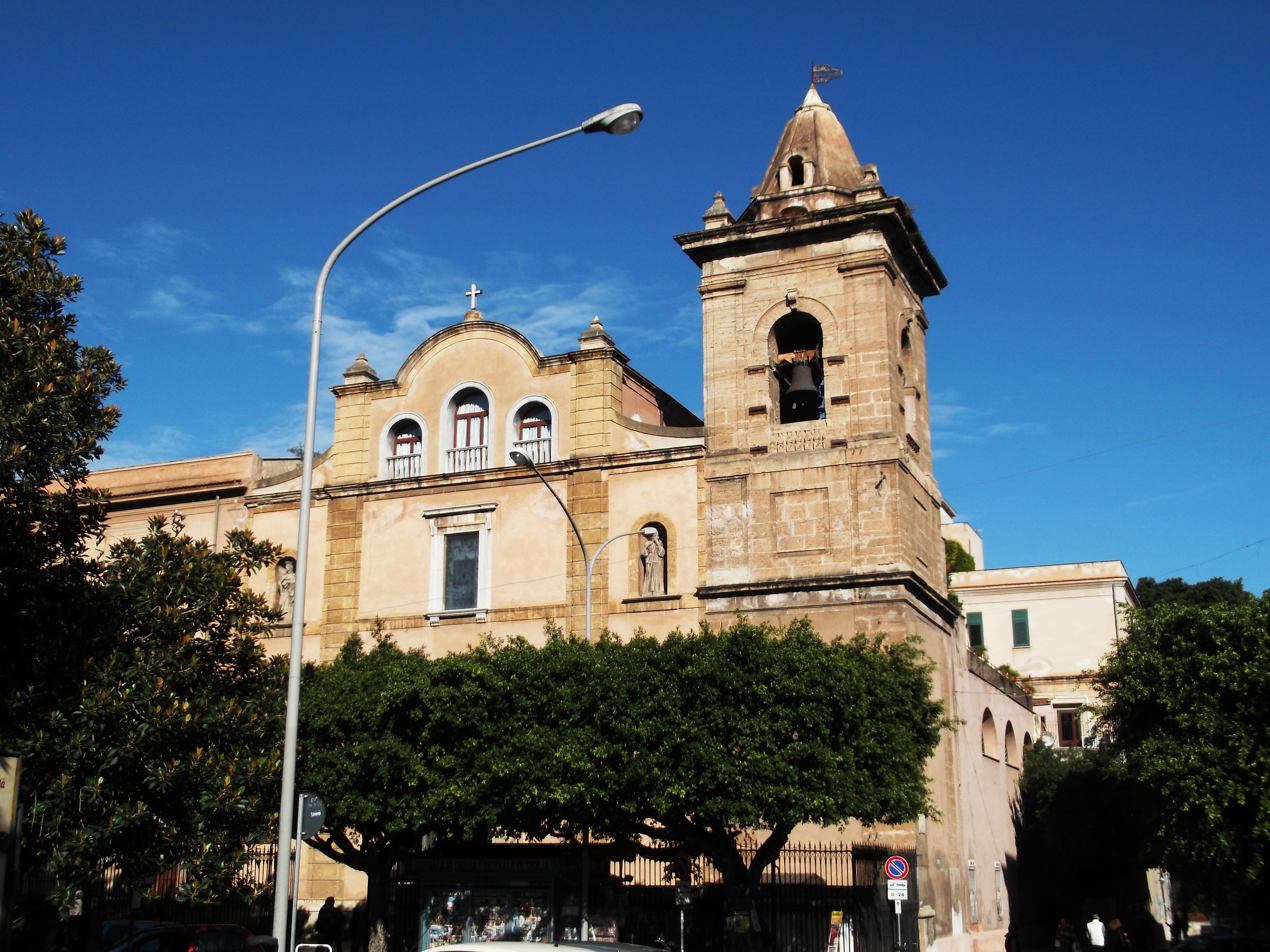
- Façade of the church from park across street

Religion
- Affiliation: Roman Catholic
- Province: Archdiocese of Palermo
- Rite: Roman Rite

Location
- Location: Palermo, Italy
- Interactive map of San Francesco di Paola
- Coordinates: 38.12169°N 13.35278°E

San Francesco di Paola is a 16th-century Roman Catholic church and monastery, located on Via Carini corner Piazza San Francesco di Paola, in Palermo, Italy.

== History and description ==
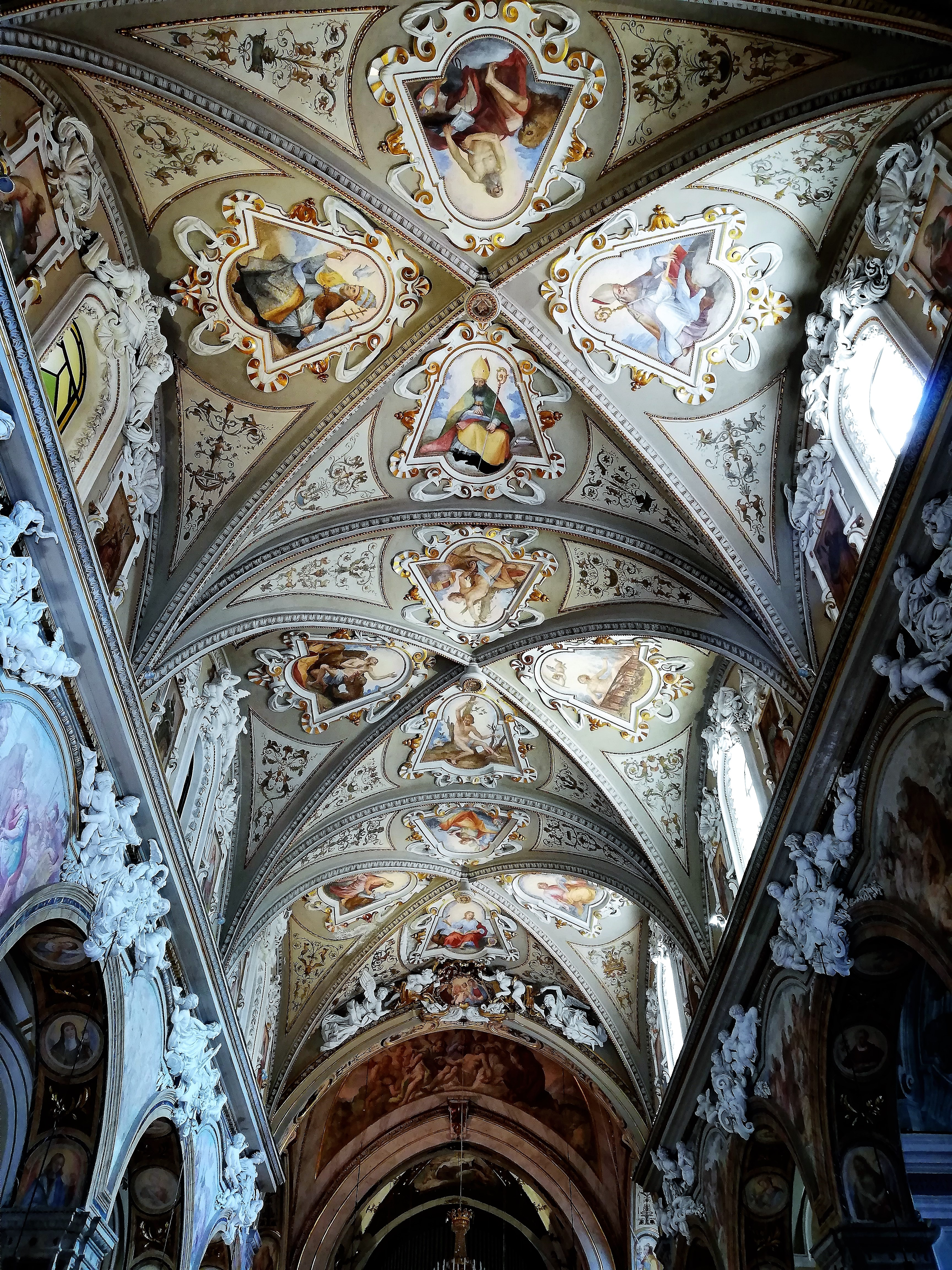
Interior nave frescoes

A vineyard and church was present at the site by the 14th century, dedicated to St Oliva, who putatively had died as a martyr in North Africa in 463, and had been buried at a cemetery here outside the city walls. A document from 1310 mentions a church or chapel at the site. It was enlarged by a confraternity of tailors in 1485. Putatively, in 1495, while the Count of Monteleone, Don Ettore Pignatelli, was imprisoned in Tours by the French King Charles VIII, he was visited by St Francis of Paola. Putatively, the friar predicted Pignatelli would be freed and made viceroy of Sicily. Viceroy Pignatelli in the early 16th century ceded the church of St Oliva to the order of Minims, recently founded by St Francis of Paola. In Palermo, there were four churches and monasteries associated with the Minims: this one, Santa Maria della Vittoria a Mezzomonreale on Corso Calatafimi; the female convent of i Sette Angeli near the Palermo Cathedral, and San Francischello on via Candelai.

Construction of the church and a cloistered monastery (known as the Monastery of Santa Oliva) was begun around 1518, in a Gothic style, replacing completely the old church of St Oliva. Refurbishments over the next centuries gave the church a layout more typical of a late-Renaissance style. The monastery also contained a large library and a hospital. After the suppression of order in 1866, the convent was converted into barracks.

The church was originally located outside the city walls, a few hundred meters north of Porta Carini. Across the small grove of trees in the piazza in front of the facade, lies the cloister of Villa Filippina. The facade has two statues of saints flanking the central portal on the second floor. To the right is a low bell-tower.

The second chapel on the right is dedicated to Saint Oliva, and has a portal with sculptures by Giacomo Gagini depicting the Madonna delle Grazie flanked by St Oliva and St Francis. The interior decoration dates mainly to the 17th and 18th century. The ceiling frescoes depicting saints, the four evangelists, and the four doctors of the church, as well as scenes from the life of St Francis of Paola, were painted by Giuseppe Salerno.
