= Santa Maria della Pietà, Palermo =

Baroque church in Palermo, Italy

Church of Saint Mary of Pity
- Chiesa di Santa Maria della Pietà (in Italian)
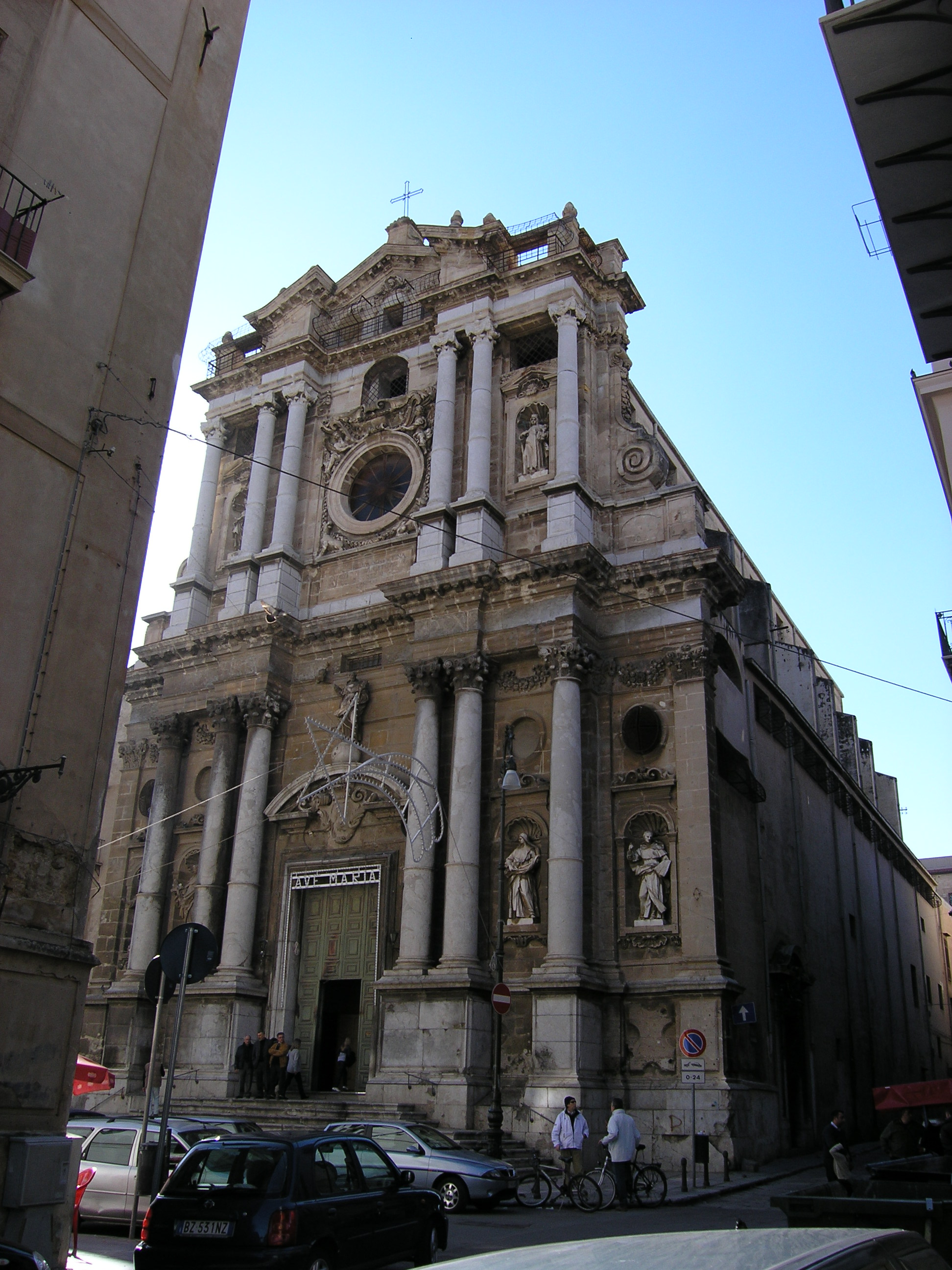
- Façade of the church

Religion
- Affiliation: Roman Catholic
- Province: Archdiocese of Palermo
- Rite: Roman Rite

Location
- Location: Palermo, Italy
- Interactive map of Church of Saint Mary of Pity
- Coordinates: 38°07′00.54″N 13°22′21.86″E

Architecture
- Architect: Giacomo Amato
- Style: Sicilian Baroque
- Groundbreaking: 1678
- Completed: 1684

The Church of Saint Mary of Pity (Italian: Chiesa di Santa Maria della Pietà) is a Baroque church of Palermo. It is located at the corner of Via Alloro and Via Torremuzza in the quarter of the Kalsa, within the historic centre of Palermo.

== History ==
Francesco Abatellis, captain in the service of the army of King Ferdinand II of Aragon, lacking heirs, endowed in 1495 the foundation of a Benedictine monastery under the name of Santa Maria della Pietà. The monastery, which occupied the Palazzo Abatellis, was founded in 1526, but contrary to the wishes of Abatellis the community of nuns elected to follow the Dominican rule. The first nuns transferred here from the monastery of Santa Caterina.

Construction of the church started in 1678. The main architect was the Camillian cleric Giacomo Amato, who also designed two churches a few steps south on Via Torremuzza: Santa Teresa alla Kalsa and San Mattia ai Crociferi. The exterior of Santa Maria della Pietà was completed around 1699, but the interior decoration continued. In 1723 the church was consecrated by the bishop of Patti Pietro Galletti, brother of the abbess of the monastery, Vincenza Maria Galletti.

== Art and decoration ==
The facade is notable for the vertical emphasis of the superimposed Corinthian columns, and the rich sculptural decoration. In the center, above the portal, is a statue of St Dominic, standing atop a globe, a work of Gioacchino Vitagliano.

Inside, in front of the counterfacade, is a one-story vestibule (sottocoro) rich in stucco and fresco decoration and graced with dark Billiemi marble columns. The frescoes were painted (1722) by Guglielmo Borremans, and depict Scenes of the Lives of Dominican Saints. These include:

- Drowning heretics of Toulouse
- Apparition of the Virgin, St Catherine of Alexandria, and Mary Magdalen to Fra Lorenzo da Grotteria in Soriano Calabro
- Resurrection of Napoleone Orsini through intercession of St Dominic
- Apparition of the Virgin to St Dominic
- Burning the prohibited books by Heretics
- St Dominic with the Crusade against the Cathars

Above this entrance, is a room allowing the cloistered nuns to listen to services behind a metal grate, and also to observe processions passing in the street in front. Passageways along the nave led them back to the monastery. The walls of the vestibule have stuccoes (1723) by Procopio, the son of Giacomo Serpotta, helped by Niccolò Sanseverino and Antonino Romano.

The long and tall single nave continues to a semicircular apse. The main altar contains a baroque altar rich in semiprecious stones. In the walls of the apse are two large canvases by Pietro dell'Aquila depicting Return of the Prodigal Son and the Encounter of Abraham and Melchisedek in the Promised Land.

The first chapel at the left has an altarpiece depicting the Pietà painted by Vincenzo da Pavia. Other altarpieces were painted by the brothers Manno.

The nave ceiling depicts a Glory of St Catherine of Siena accompanied by St Dominic (1708) by Antonio Grano. Other frescoes depict The mystical dream of the blessed Guala de Roniis of Brescia, where he sees St Dominic rise to heaven through stairs held by Christ and the Virgin. On the right flank of the nave is a depiction of the Apparition of the Virgin to the blessed Reginald of Orléans and St Dominic in which the Virgin grants the Dominican scapular. Other frescoed compartments depict prominent Dominican nuns including the Blessed Margaret of Savoy, on a pink cloud holding three lances. Another is likely Margaret of Città di Castello (also known as Margherita della Metola) holding a lily and with a heart with three spheres. Also featured is the blessed Lucia, St Agnes of Montepulciano, and others, possibly St Catherine of Ricci, the blessed Stephana de Quinzanis, or the blessed Imelda Lambertini.
