= Santa Maria della Pietà =

Santa Maria della Pietà may refer to:

- Santi Bartolomeo ed Alessandro dei Bergamaschi, Rome
- Santa Maria della Pietà in Camposanto dei Teutonici, Rome
- Church of Santa Maria della Pietà, Abruzzo
- Church of Santa Maria della Pietà, Ferrara (Chiesa Teatini)
- Church of Santa Maria della Pietà, Palermo,
- Church of Santa Maria della Pietà, Venice
- Cappella Sansevero, Naples
