= San Mattia ai Crociferi, Palermo =

Deconsecrated church in Palermo, Italy

San Mattia Apostolo
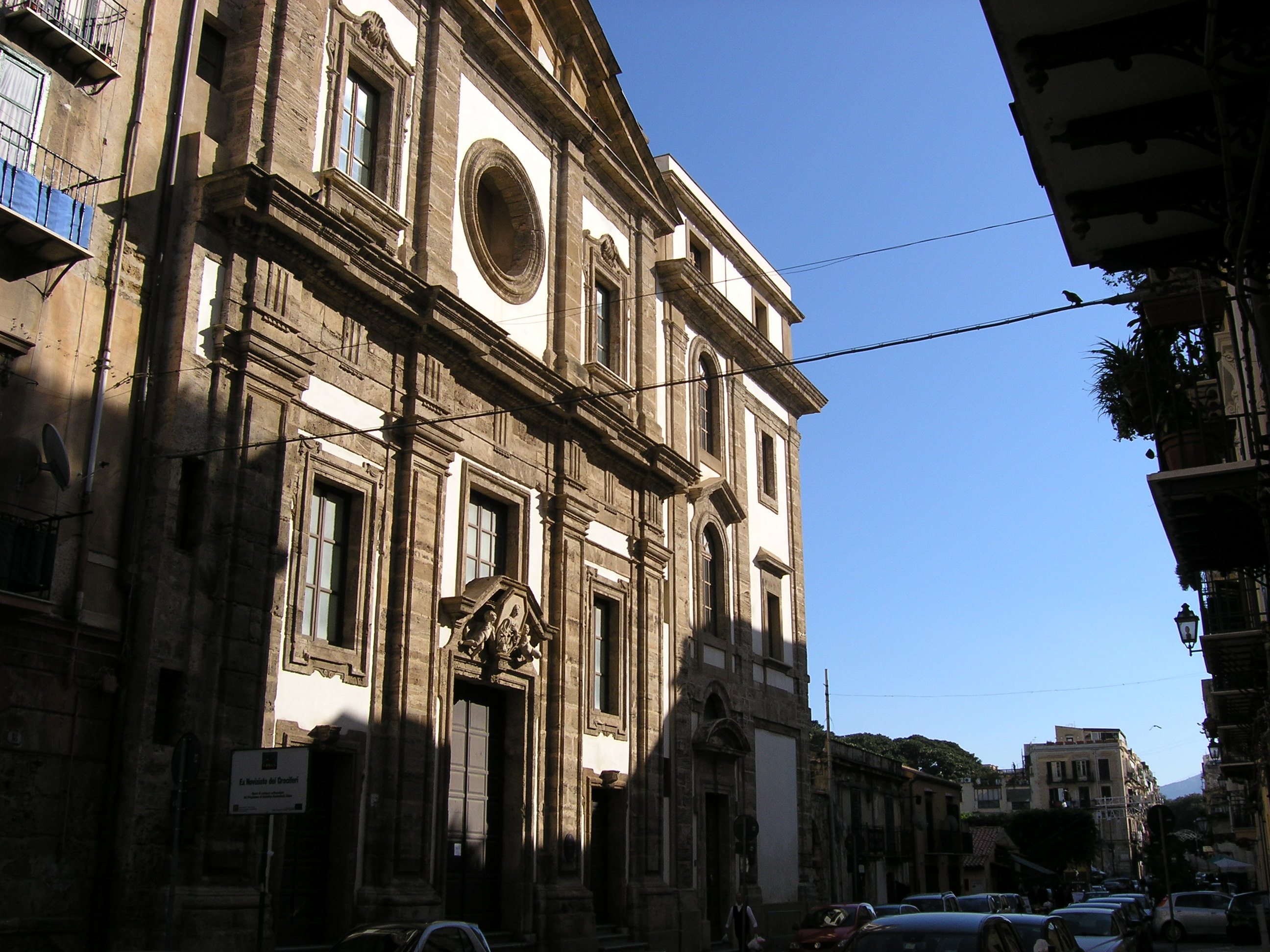
- Façade of the church

Location
- Location: Palermo, Italy
- Interactive map of San Mattia Apostolo
- Coordinates: 38.11698°N 13.37254°E

Architecture
- Architect: Giacomo Amato
- Style: Sicilian Baroque
- Completed: 1686

San Mattia ai Crociferi is a Baroque-style, deconsecrated church, located on Via Torremuza #18 in the Kalsa quarter of central of Palermo, region of Sicily, Italy. Just diagonal, and to the north is the church of Santa Maria della Pietà.

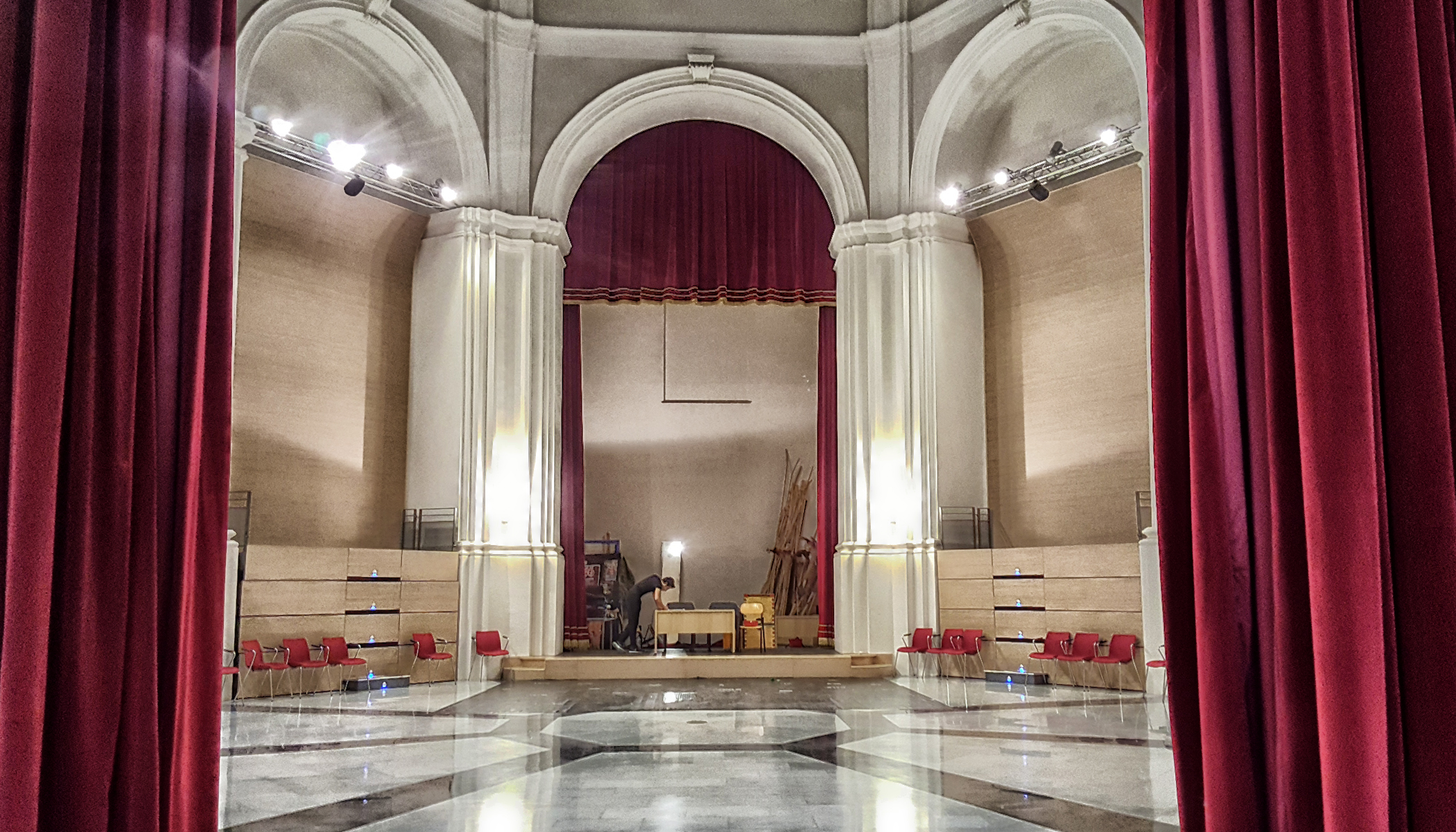
Octagonal nave used for concerts

The church and adjacent seminary was designed by Giacomo Amato and completed in 1686 for the Camillians, known locally as the Crociferi due to their habit of a black cassock with a large red cross. In 1866, the order was suppressed and the building is now used by the municipality for cultural exhibits and concerts. The interior of the church has an octagonal room under a dome.
