= Oratorio dei Bianchi, Palermo =

Prayer room or oratory in Palermo, Italy

Oratory of the Whites
- Oratorio dei Bianchi
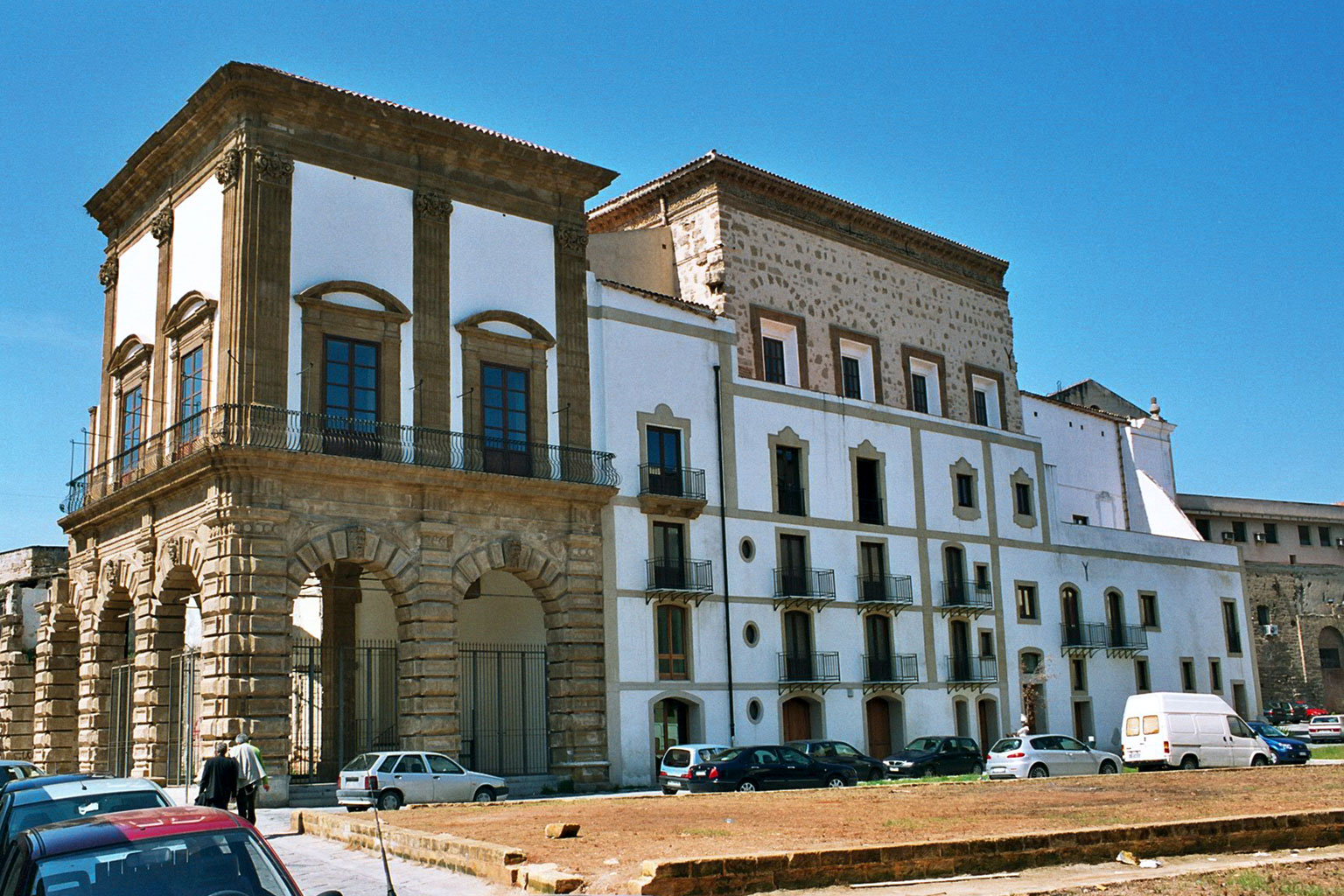
- Exteriof of oratory

Religion
- Affiliation: Roman Catholic
- Province: Archdiocese of Palermo
- Rite: Roman Rite

Location
- Location: Palermo, Italy
- Interactive map of Oratory of the Whites
- Coordinates: 38.11537°N 13.37203°E

The Oratorio dei Bianchi is a Baroque prayer room or oratory located on the Piazzeta dei Bianchi, about equidistant between the churches of Santa Maria dello Spasimo and Santa Teresa alla Kalsa in the quarter of the Kalsa, within the historic centre of Palermo, region of Sicily, Italy.

== History ==
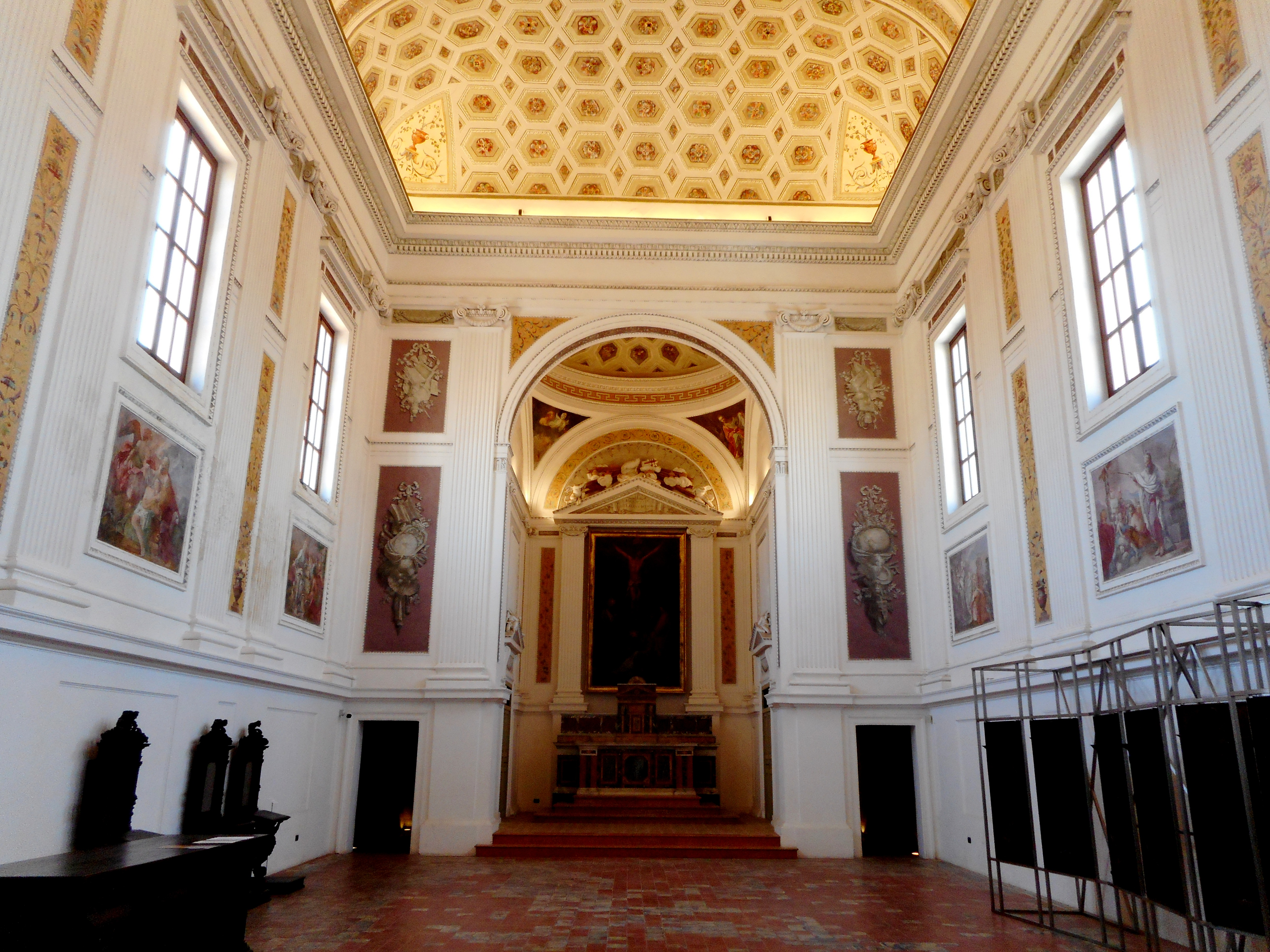
Interior of oratory

This peculiar oratory is composed of diverse components incongruently linked. The main oratory was built in 1686, after a fire in 1600 destroyed the prior church of Santa Maria della Vittoria, initially built by the Minims order in 1477. This ancient church was dedicated to the Virgin and contained the tag della Vittoria, because in the 11th-century, the Normans under Robert Guiscard had been able to enter the besieged Saracen city through a gate at this site.

The ground floor of the exterior is made from large stone blocks with masks sculpted in the arch keystones. The second story has a more sober facade with Corinthian pilasters. The confraternity or Compagnia del SS. Crocifisso was also called the Company of the bianchi or whites due to their white processional gowns. Their main charity was to accompany and minister to those condemned for execution. The interiors have a few stucco sculptures completed by Serpotta and his family, The main meeting room for the members was frescoed in 1776 by Gaspare Fumagalli in a neoclassical style.
