= Goat Song (disambiguation) =

Goat Song is a novel by Frank Yerby.

Goat song may also refer to:

- Occasional literal translation from original Greek τραγῳδία of the term "tragedy" used as a pun in a number of titles
- "Goat Song" (novelette), 1972 novelette by Poul Anderson
- Goat Song (Козлиная песнь), novel by Russian author Konstantin Vaginov
- Goat Song, memoir by Brad Kessler
- Goat Song, 1984 novel by Dodici Azpadu
- Goat Song Records, American comedy record label founded by Dan Dion
- "Goat Song", a track on the album Fledgling by The Marshes

== See also ==
- A Goat's Song, 1994 novel by Dermot Healy
