= Ignazio Pollice =

Italian composer

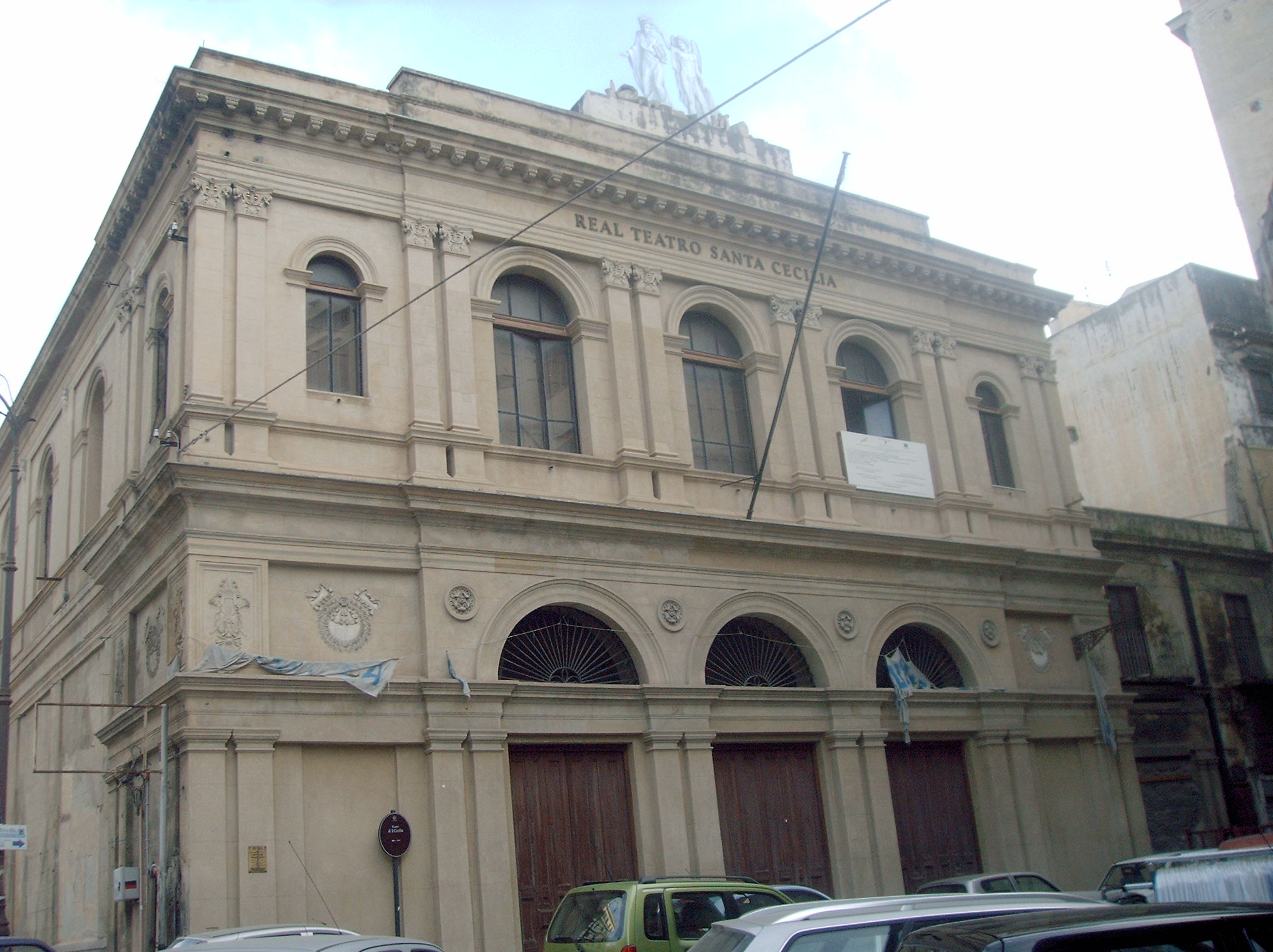
Teatro Santa Cecilia in Palermo, Sicily; Pollice's sacred opera was the first music performed here in 1693.

Ignazio Pollice (also Pulici) (fl. 1684–1705) was an Italian composer of the Baroque era, from Palermo. He is most famous for his L'innocenza pentita: o vero la Santa Rosalia, which opened the just-built Teatro Santa Cecilia in Palermo in 1693.

Few biographical details of Pollice's life are available, but some of his performance history is known. He was a representative of the Neapolitan School, and wrote during a period dominated by Alessandro Scarlatti, who was also from Palermo. In Palermo, opera came late, and principally from Naples; many opera houses and other musical institutions were founded in the city during the closing decades of the 17th century. Pollice wrote both sacred and secular music, including the oratorio La vita rediviva nell'inventione di Santa Croce (1705), the dialogues Assalone ribelle and Scalae Jacob (1684 and 1700, respectively), and the opera Isabella ovvero il Principe ermafrodito (1685). The sacred drama L'innocenza pentita o vero la Santa Rosalia opened on 28 October 1693 at the new Teatro Santa Cecilia; the libretto was by Vincenzo Giattino; and the new theatre was built by the Unione dei Musici.
