= Fontana del Garraffo =

Garraffo Fountain
- Fontana del Garraffo (Italian)
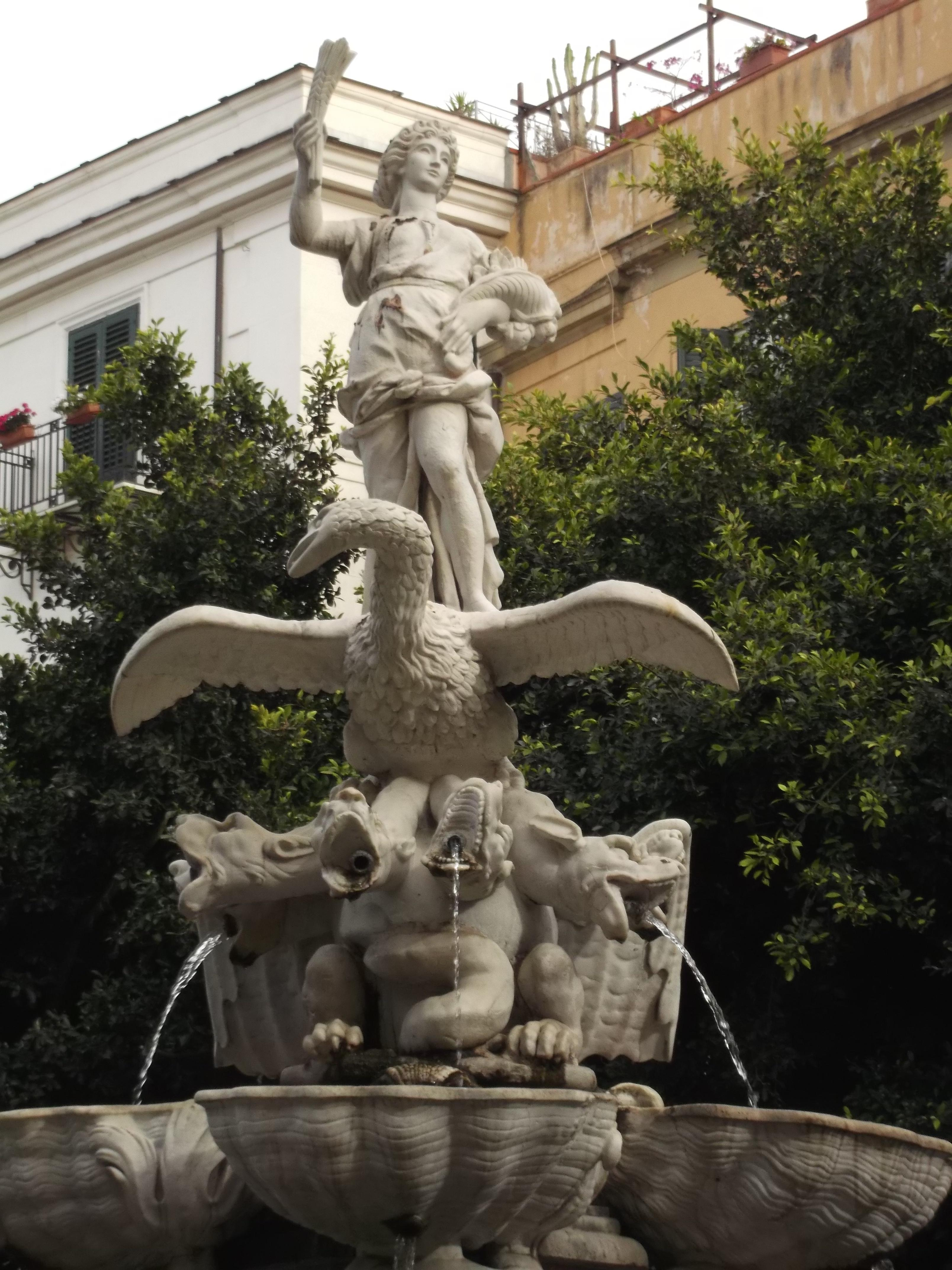
- Particular of the fountain
- Artist: Gioacchino Vitagliano
- Year: 1698
- Type: Public fountain
- Location: Palermo, Sicily, Italy; 38°07′04.67″N 13°22′02.81″E

The Garraffo Fountain (Italian: Fontana del Garraffo) is a Baroque fountain of Palermo. It is located in Piazza Marina, down the ancient Cassaro street, now called Via Vittorio Emanuele, within the historic centre of Palermo.

== History ==
The name of the fountain comes from the Arabic word "Gharraf", meaning the abundance of water. It was sculpted by Gioacchino Vitagliano in 1698, although the design was previously realized by the architect Paolo Amato. The sculpture represents an abundance goddess riding an eagle fighting against a hydra.

The significance of the allegorical elements is not clear. The eagle could be a symbol of either Palermo or the Hapsburg Spanish monarchy. The statue was patronized by the Spanish Praetor Andrea Salazar.

The location of the Garraffo fountain was in a small piazzetta in the market of the Vucciria market, in front of the monument called Genio del Garraffo, and near the church of Sant'Eulalia dei Catalani until 1862, when it was moved to this airy and verdant Piazza Marina.

A different fountain of the Garaffo, now referred to as the Fontana del Garraffello, was erected in 1589 (or 1591) in piazzetta del Garaffo, it had been moved from its original sited due to the seepage into a neighboring house.

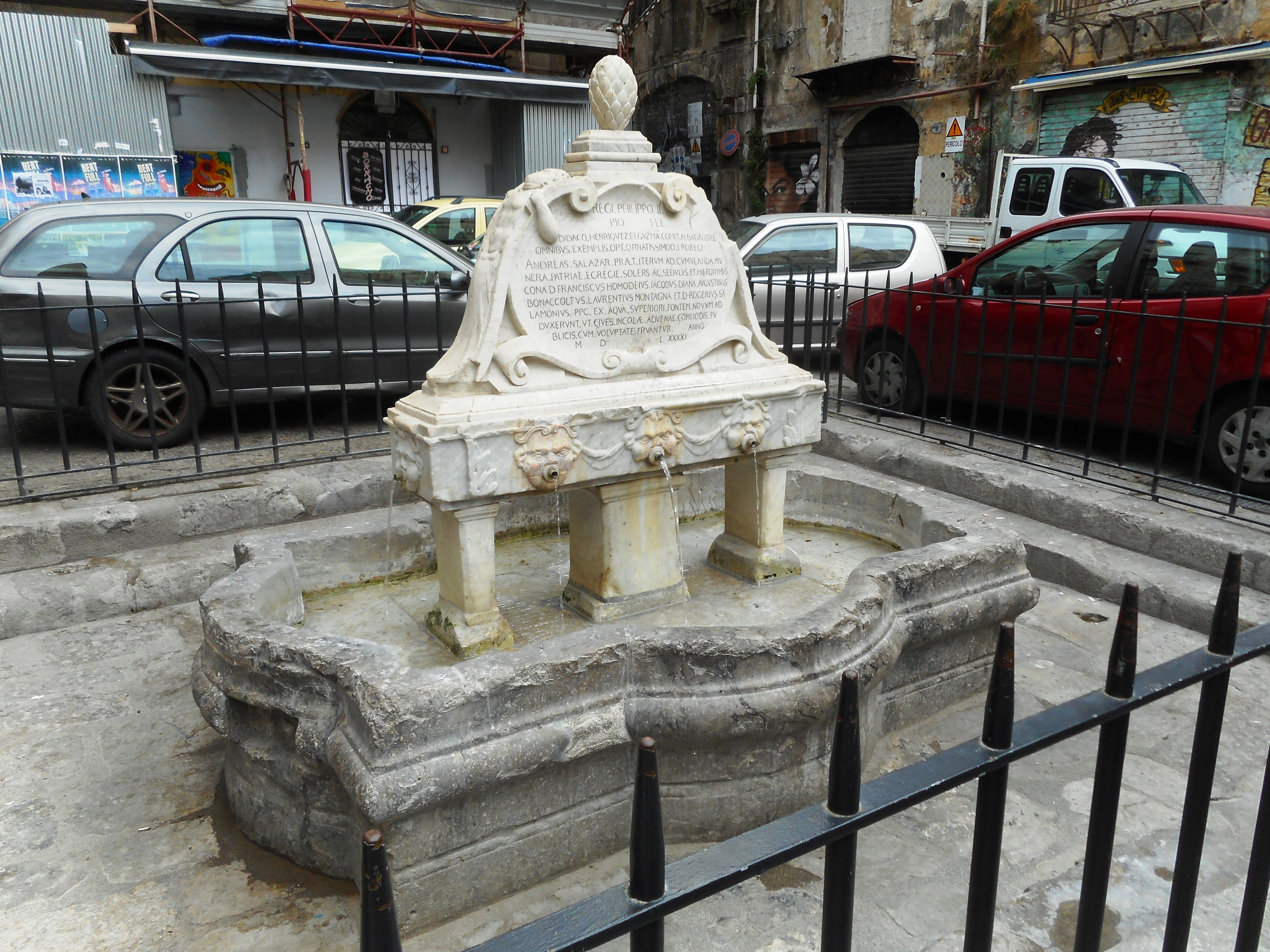
Fontana del Garraffello in Vucciria market (piazza del Garraffello)
