= Teatro Santa Cecilia, Palermo =

Coordinates: 38.11418°N 13.36556°E

Teatro Santa Cecilia
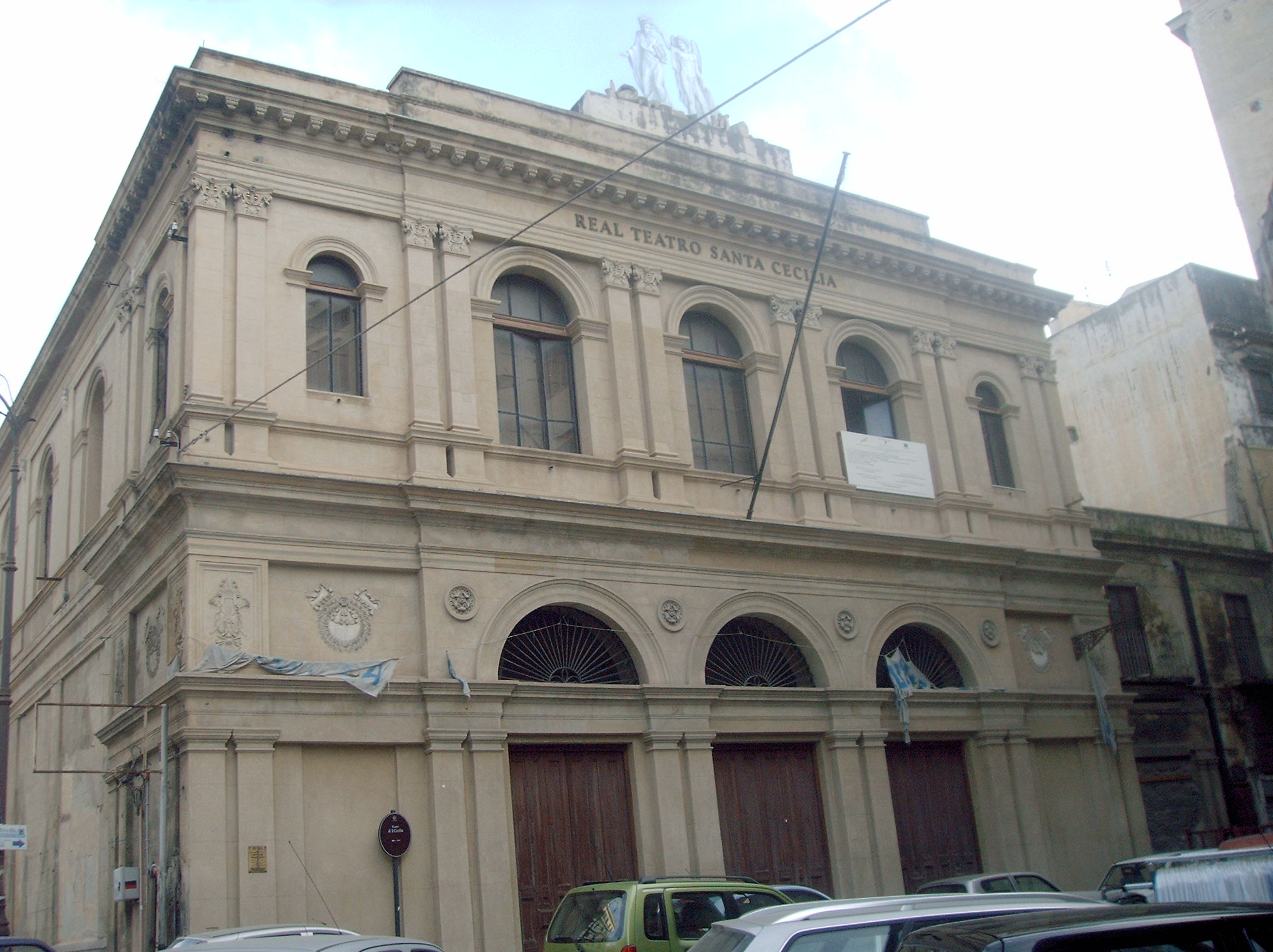
- Facade of the Teatro Santa Cecilia
- Interactive map of Teatro Santa Cecilia
- Address: Piazza Teatro Santa Cecilia
- Location: Palermo, Italy

Construction
- Built: 1692

The Teatro Santa Cecilia or Real Teatro di Santa Cecilia is a neoclassical-style theater building located on Piazza Teatro Santa Cecilia at the intersections with Via Cantavespri and Vicolo Guarnernara, in the ancient quarter of Kalsa of central Palermo, region of Sicily, Italy.

== History ==
The theater was founded in 1692 by the Union of Musicians under the patronage of Viceroy Duke of Uceda himself, and for the following century was a competitor of the Teatro Bellini for opera, song, and orchestral productions. At the inauguration, the work of L'innocenza pentita: o vero la Santa Rosalia by Vincenzo Giattini with music by Ignazio Pulicò was performed.

In 1853 the buildings underwent a major reconstruction, giving it the present Neoclassical facade. In the 19th century, it closed as a performance theater to become a wax museum, but closed all activities in 1888. Not until the year 2000-2006, were European funds appropriated for restoration. Presently the theater, stripped internally of the typical opera hall seating, is used for performances of modern and contemporary music.
