= Giacomo Amato =

Sicilian architect

- Portrait of Giacomo Amato
- Born: 14 May 1643; Palermo, Kingdom of Sicily
- Died: 26 December 1732 (aged 89); Palermo, Kingdom of Sicily
- Occupation: Architect
- Known for: Santa Teresa alla Kalsa; Santa Maria della Pietà, Palermo; San Mattia ai Crociferi; Oratory of San Lorenzo
- Movement: Sicilian Baroque

Giacomo Amato (14 May 1643 in Palermo – 26 December 1732 in Palermo) was a Sicilian Baroque architect. Amato designed several scenographic Baroque churches in Palermo, like Santa Teresa alla Kalsa, Santa Maria della Pietà and San Mattia ai Crociferi, which are considered masterpieces of the Palermitan Baroque period.

== Biography ==
Member of the religious order of the Camillians, Giacomo Amato was pupil of Paolo Amato. In the 1670s he was called to Rome by his Order to work first as an assistant to Carlo Bizzaccheri then as supervisor on the enlargement of the convent of Santa Maria Maddalena – the mother church of the Camillians. In Rome Amato had the opportunity to study closely the works of Carlo Fontana, Gian Lorenzo Bernini and Francesco Borromini.

Returning to Palermo by 1685, he produced work that showed Roman influences. His studies for the façade of the monumental church of Santa Maria della Pietà (1678–1723), with which he became associated in the late 1680s, fuse elements from Sant'Andrea della Valle and Girolamo Rainaldi’s Santa Maria in Campitelli, both in Rome. While subduing the horizontal plasticity of the Roman façades, however, Amato intensified the vertical stress of his own: his free-standing superimposed columns are placed at the sides like a partially drawn-back screen, an effect enhanced by his use of the contrasting colours of tufa and Billiemi limestone. The façade’s circular window, a clear medieval reference, is characteristically Sicilian and distinguishes the building from contemporary Roman design. The interior decoration (1690s) is striking for its use of vernacular forms and such gilded metalwork as the nun’s grille at the west end, which rises like an elaborate fan into the grand barrel vault. The discrepancy between the broad lower and narrow upper storeys of Santa Teresa alla Kalsa (1686–1706), Palermo, allows the chapel lanterns to appear beside the volutes, an unorthodox idea. The cold and formal interior (begun 1702), on a standard plan for a convent church, shows no concessions to vernacular taste in either architectural articulation or decorative detail.

Together with the stuccoist Giacomo Serpotta and the painter Antonio Grano (1660–1718), Amato created the most influential interiors of late 17th- and early 18th-century Palermo. The decoration of the Oratory of San Lorenzo (1699–1707) is characteristic in its use of teatrini, scenes from the lives of the saints, made with small allegorical figures developed from a Sicilian tradition. He also designed a number of palaces and their interiors, including the Branciforte Casino and the Cutò (begun 1705), Tarallo and Spaccaforno palaces. Only drawings and plans of these survive (Palermo, Galleria Regionale della Sicilia). The rooms are decorated with gilded and tinted stucco vaults, marble mirrors and gilded wood, producing an overall effect close to that of Amato’s church interiors. Amato died in Palermo on 14 May 1643, aged 89.

== Bibliography ==
- Biagi, Luigi (1939). "Giacomo Amato e la sua posizione nell'architettura palermitana". L’Arte. 42: 29–48.
- Vanti, Mario (1960). "AMATO, Giacomo". Dizionario Biografico degli Italiani (in Italian). Vol. 2: Albicante–Ammannati. Rome: Institute of the Italian Encyclopaedia. OCLC 883370.
- Blunt, Anthony (1968). Sicilian Baroque. London: Weidenfeld & Nicolson. ISBN 978-0297764403.
- Garstang, Donald (1984). Giacomo Serpotta and the Stuccatori of Palermo. London: A. Zwemmer.
- Wittkower, Rudolf; Connors, Joseph; Montagu, Jennifer (1999). Art and Architecture in Italy, 1600–1750. Vol. 3: Late Baroque and Rococo, 1675–1750. New Haven, Connecticut: Yale University Press. ISBN 978-0-300-07941-8.
- Cavi, Sabina de (2015). "Corpus Christi in Spanish Palermo: Two Baroque Apparati by Giacomo Amato for the Duke of Uceda (Viceroy of Sicily, 1687-1696)". In Fernando Checa Cremades; Laura Fernández-González (eds.). Festival Culture in the World of the Spanish Habsburgs. Farnham: Ashgate Publishing. pp. 219–240. ISBN 978-1-4094-3561-7.
- Baudez, Basile (2021). Inessential Colors: Architecture on Paper in Early Modern Europe. Princeton: Princeton University Press. ISBN 978-0-691-21356-9.
