= Santa Maria dell'Itria dei Cocchieri =

Church building in Palermo, Italy

- Santa Maria dell'Itria alla Kalsa
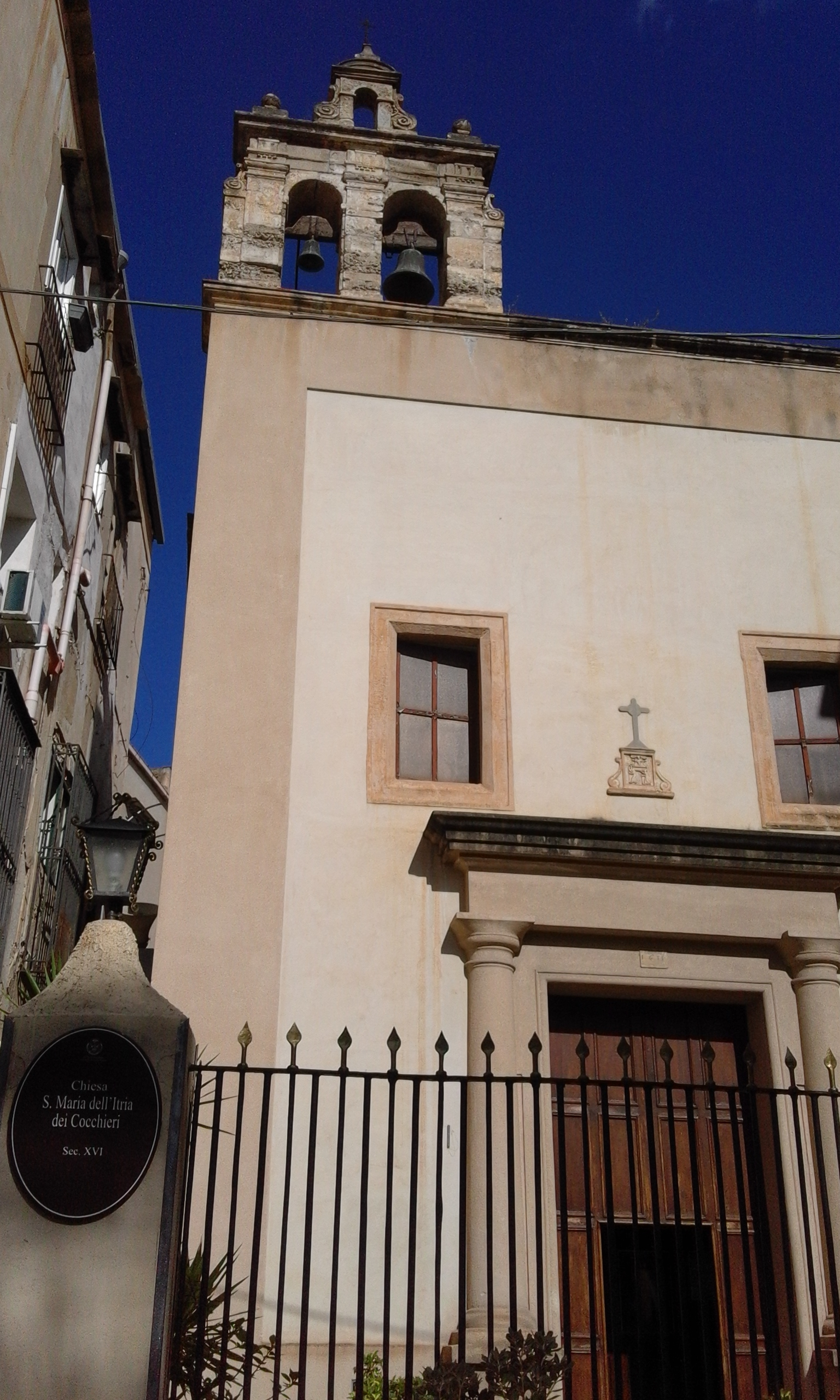
- Facade with sail like campanile

Religion
- Affiliation: Roman Catholic
- Province: Archdiocese of Palermo
- Rite: Roman Rite

Location
- Interactive map of Santa Maria dell'Itria dei Cocchieri
- Coordinates: 38.11540°N 13.36746°E

Santa Maria dell'Itria dei Cocchieri, also called Santa Maria dell'Itria alla Kalsa is a small, Rensissance-style, Roman Catholic church of Palermo. It is located on the Piazzetta dei Cocchieri, just off via Alloro, in the quarter of Kalsa (Tribunali) of the historic centre of Palermo. Across via Alloro is the small public pocket park of Giardino dei Giusti.

== History ==
The cocchieri or coachmen had formed officially a confraternity in Palermo by 1596. They participated in the processions of on Holy Friday, marching as groups from individual major aristocratic families. Since transport in town was banned on that day, the coachmen were free to attend to this procession. This plain church was begun in 1596 and completed 1614. Over the centuries, the church suffered much from calamity and loss. The original Marian Simulacrum depicting the Virgin of the Sorrows above the dead Christ built for the procession burned in a fire of 1896, although a replica was soon made.
