= Palazzo Chiaramonte =

Palace in Palermo, Italy

Coordinates: 38°07′04″N 13°22′12″E

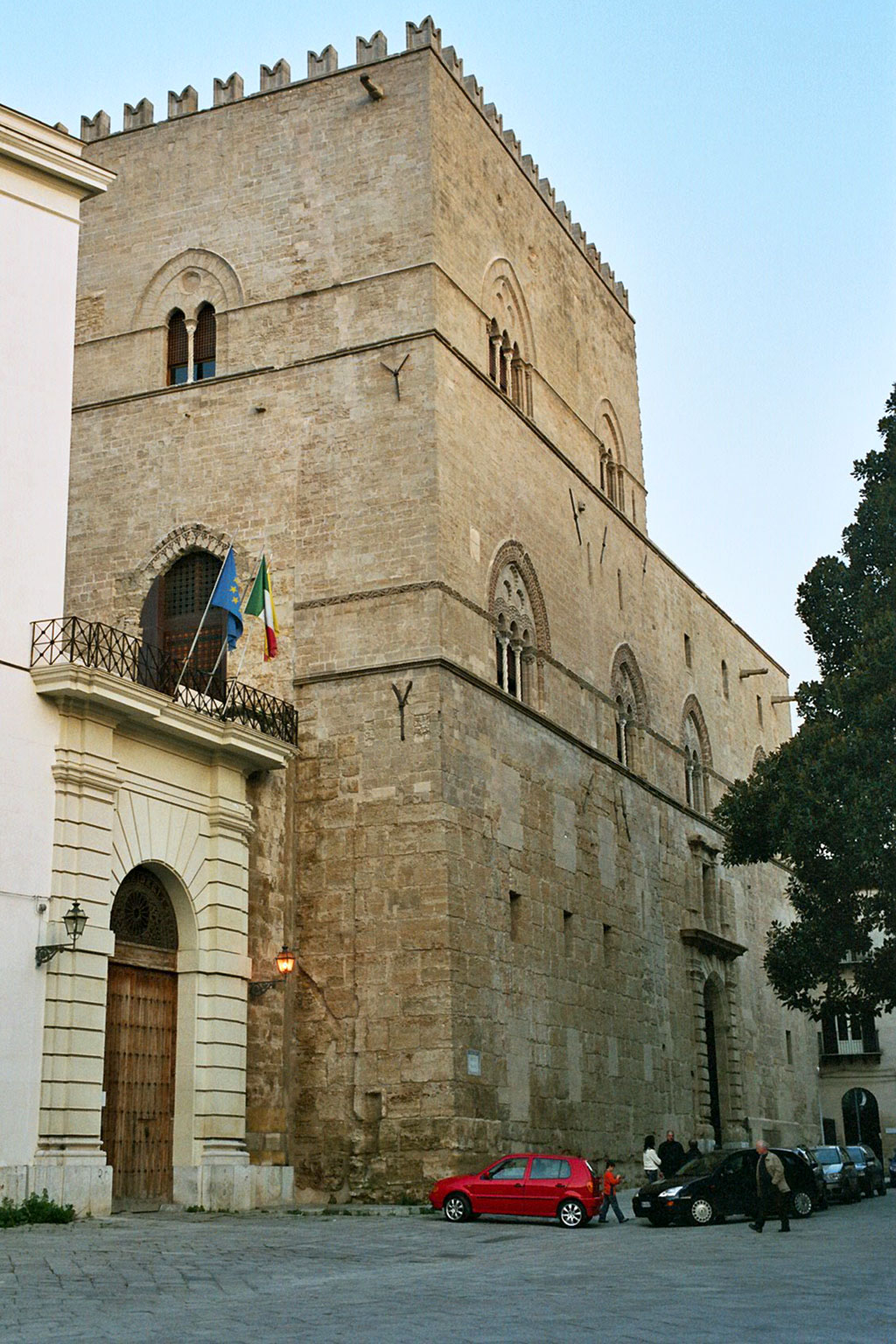
Palazzo Chiaramonte-Steri.

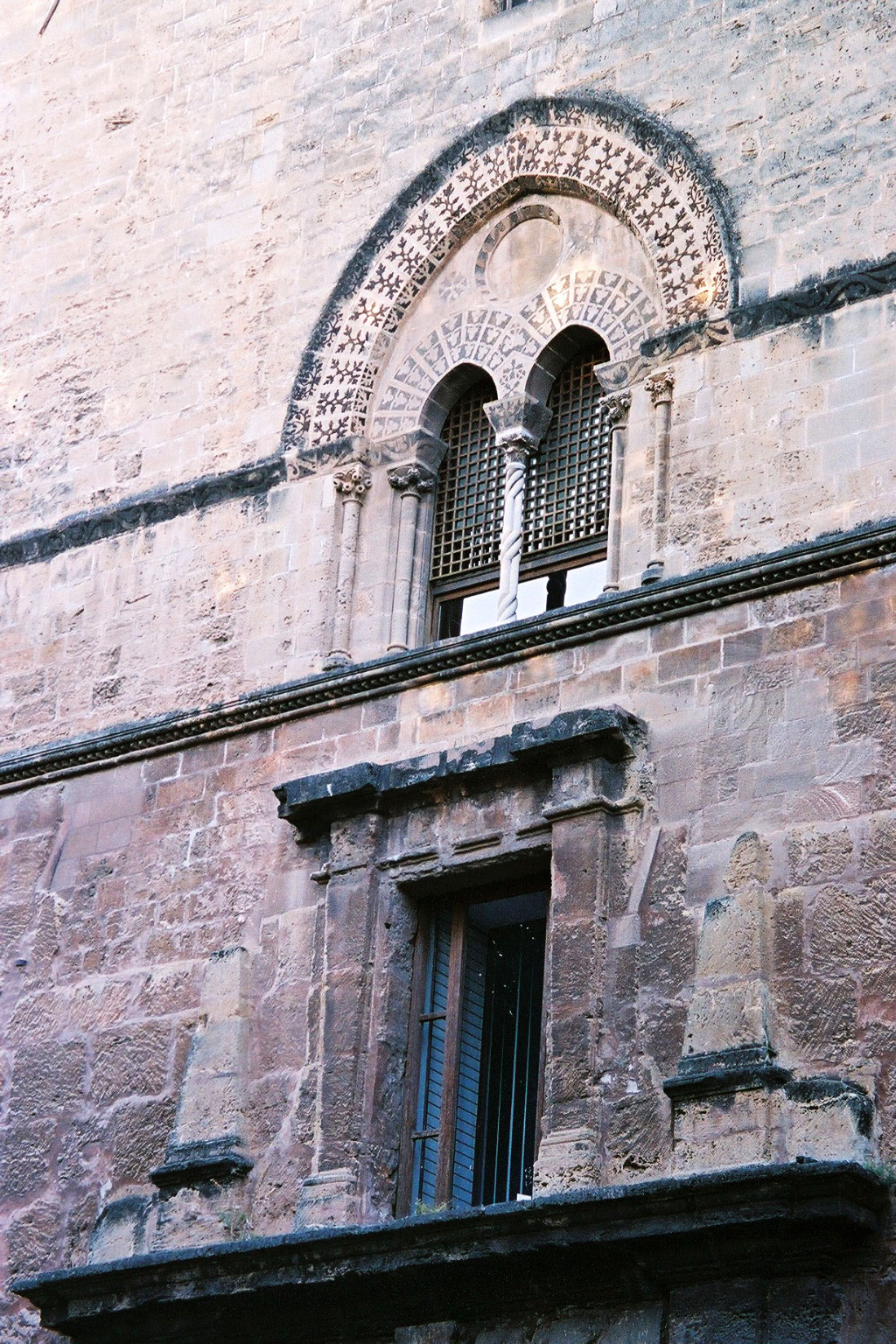
A double mullioned window.

Palazzo Chiaramonte-Steri is a Gothic-style palace located on via Piazza Marina, facing the Giardino Garibaldi in the ancient quarter of Kalsa of Palermo, region of Sicily, Italy.

== History ==
The building, intended to be the family palace or castle, was begun as by 1320 under the patronage of the powerful Sicilian lord Manfredi III Chiaramonte. He commissioned the decoration of the Sala Magna ("Grand Hall"), with a painted wooden ceiling by Cecco di Naro, Simone da Corleone and Pellegrino Darena. From the late 15th century to 1517 it housed the Aragonese-Spanish viceroys of Sicily; later it was home to the Royal Customs and, from 1600 to 1782, the tribunal of the Holy Inquisition.

The ground floor is mainly a rusticated stone wall, while the second story, piano nobile, is graced with mullioned windows. The tower's roofline is merlionated.

The palace was restored in the 20th century, with numerous elements associated with its role as a jail of the Inquisition. During the works, the grooves left by iron cages in which had been hung the severed heads of the nobles who had rebelled against emperor Charles V were discovered in the façade. The palace is now both a museum and houses the offices of the rector of the University of Palermo. Among the artworks housed in the museum is Renato Guttuso's Vucciria. At the rear is the small Gothic church of Sant'Antonio Abate.

== Sources ==
- Gabrici, Ettore; Ezio Levi (2003). Lo Steri di Palermo e le sue pitture. Palermo: L'Epos.
