= Dodici Azpadu =

American novelist

- Born: c.1945 Red Hook, Brooklyn, U.S.
- Education: St. Joseph's College; Iowa Writers' Workshop (MFA); Pacific Western University (PhD)
- Occupations: Novelist; poet; teacher
- Website: www.dodici-azpadu.com

Dodici Azpadu (born c. 1945) is one of the few American novelists writing from a distinctly Sicilian-American and lesbian perspective. She has also published several volumes of poetry.

== Biography ==
Azpadu was born in the Red Hook neighborhood of Brooklyn, New York, in the 1940s. Her family emigrated from the Kalsa, a historical quarter in Palermo. She earned a bachelor's degree from St. Joseph's College in New York, a Master of Fine Arts degree at the Iowa Writer's Workshop, where she studied with José Donoso, and a Ph.D. in English Language and Literature at Pacific Western University. She has taught at Gannon College, The University of New Mexico's Honors College, and Central New Mexico Community College. She lives in Albuquerque, New Mexico, where she teaches creative writing.

Her poetry, short stories, and other writings have appeared in many literary journals, including Off Our Backs, The Found Poetry Review, and Sinister Wisdom; and in anthologies, such as Hey Paesan! Writing by Lesbians and Gay Men of Italian Descent (1999), Centos: A Collection of Collage Poems (2011), and Mary Jo Bona's The Voices We Carry: Recent Italian American Women's Fiction (2007). She received a teaching fellowship from the A Room of Her Own Foundation (AROHO) in 2013. Her third novel, Living Room, was named one of the best LGBT books of 2011 by publisher Carol Seajay of the Feminist Press. Azpadu's unique contribution to Italian-American literature has been noted by leading scholars in the field.

== Works ==
- Saturday Night in the Prime of Life (1983)
- Goat Song (1984)
- Rumi's Falcon (2005)
- Living Room (2010)
- Saturday Night: A Novella (2011)
- Wearing the Phantom Out (2013)
- Traces of a Woman (2015)
