= San Giovanni dei Napoletani, Palermo =

Church building in Palermo, Italy

San Giovanni dei Napoletani
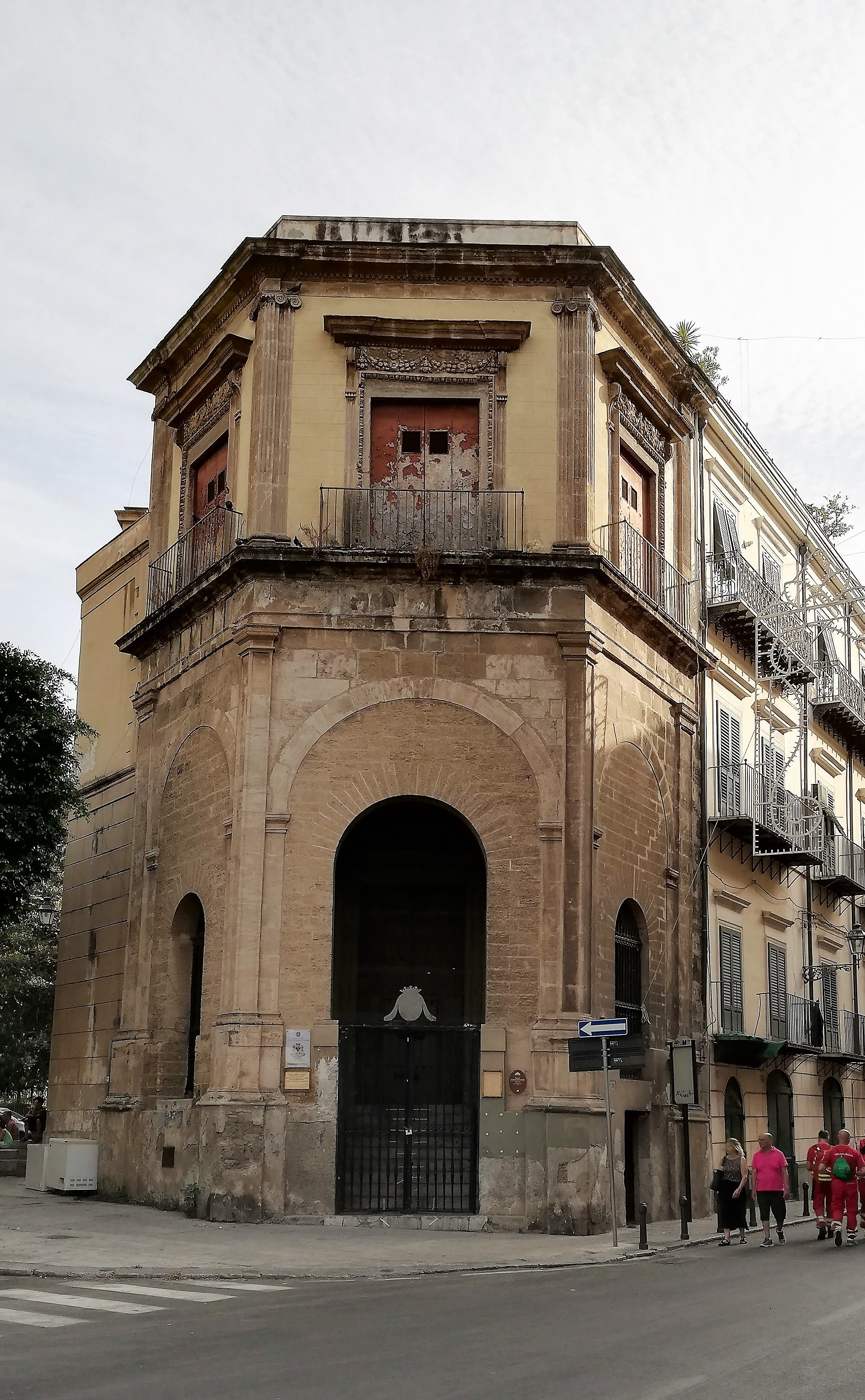
- Western façade of the church

Religion
- Affiliation: Roman Catholic
- Province: Archdiocese of Palermo
- Rite: Roman Rite

Location
- Location: Via Vittorio Emanuele 36, Palermo, Italy
- Interactive map of San Giovanni dei Napoletani
- Coordinates: 38.11875°N 13.36917°E

The San Giovanni dei Napoletani (English: St. John of the Neapolitans) is a late-Baroque or neoclassical church of Palermo. It is located in the Kalsa (Tribunali) quarter of the historic centre of Palermo. It is located diagonally in front of the church of Santa Maria della Catena.

== History ==
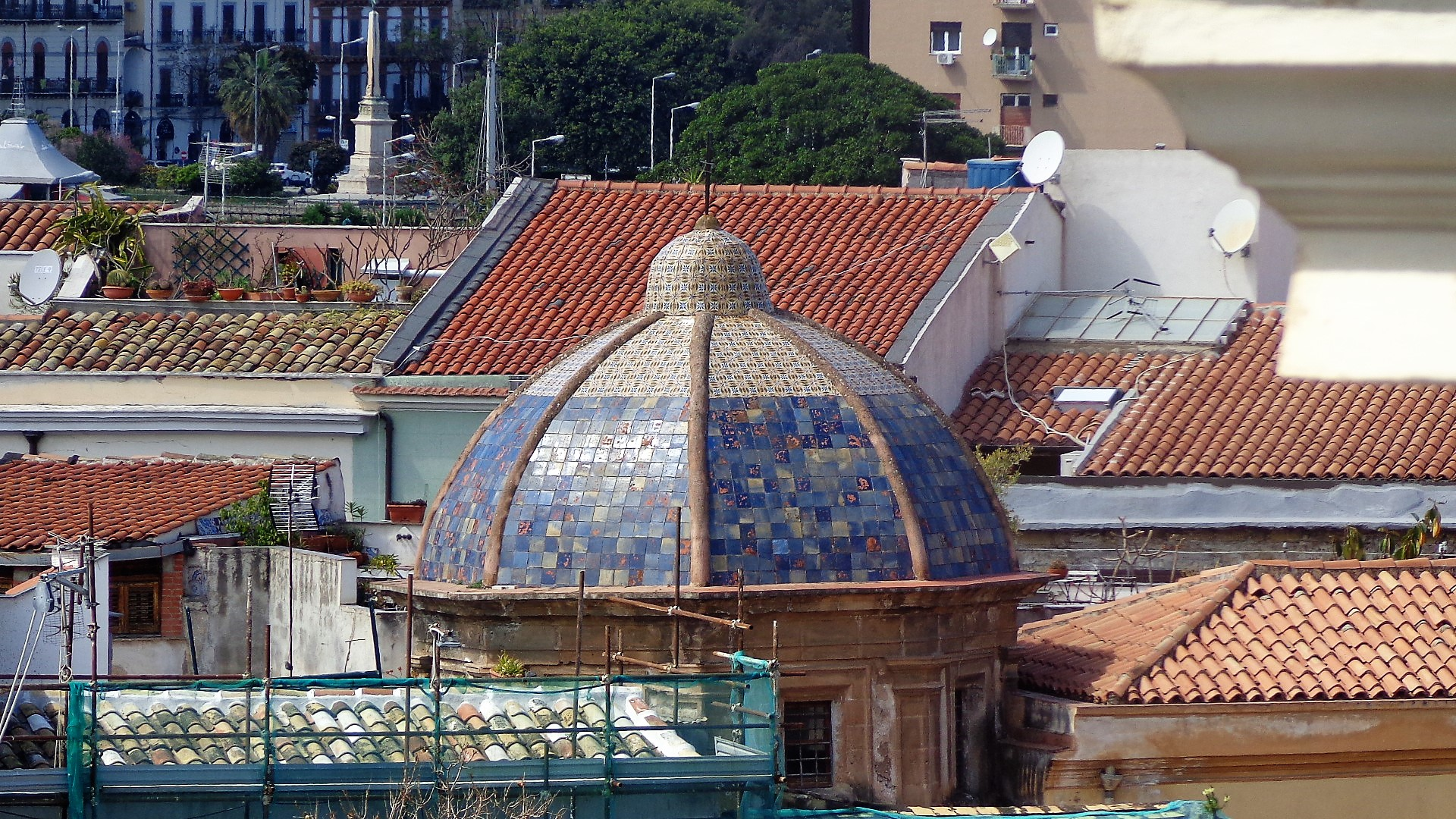
Dome from Piazza Marina

A church was originally founded in 1527 by the confraternity of San Giovanni Battista la Nazione Napoletana, which ministered to the merchants from Naples in Palermo. It is not surprising that it was located adjacent to the harbor where to boats would move cargo. A few years before, the merchants had begun construction of a church near a castle guarding the harbor, but the emperor Charles V had ordered the demolition to amplify the fort, leading to new construction here. The church was completed in 1617.

In 1925, the church changed hands to belong to the Confraternita della Carità, and was then used as a storage for works from the nearby Galleria Regionale di Palazzo Abatellis. Recently it has been reconsecrated and placed under the care of the Order of Knights of the Temple of Jerusalem (Cavalieri del Tempio di Gerusalemme).

The Western facade facing Via Vittorio Emanuele is narrow and minimally conspicuous, as it smooths the acute angle of this end of the church. The Southeastern (right) flank of the church has a secondary facade facing the Giardino Garibaldi of the Piazza Marina.

At the apse, is a low octagonal dome with colorful maiolica tiles. The nave is separated from the aisles by slender marble columns. The apse has two chapels, dedicated to the Holy Spirit and the Glory of God the Father. The latter chapel has a Holy Family by an unknown author. The interiors have a restrained stucco decoration, leaning towards neoclassicism, and completed by Procopio Serpotta. He also completed the apse statuary of the four virtues: Prudence and Temperance on the left and Justice and Fortitude on the right. The right nave has a funeral monument dedicated to Tommaso Trabucco (1690-1761), rector of the confraternity. The nave ceiling once had a fresco depicting St John the Baptist by Giuseppe Salerno. The church once had altarpieces depicting an Annunciation and Holy Trinity by Giuseppe Albina.
