= Palazzo Forcella de Seta =

Palace in Sicily, Italy

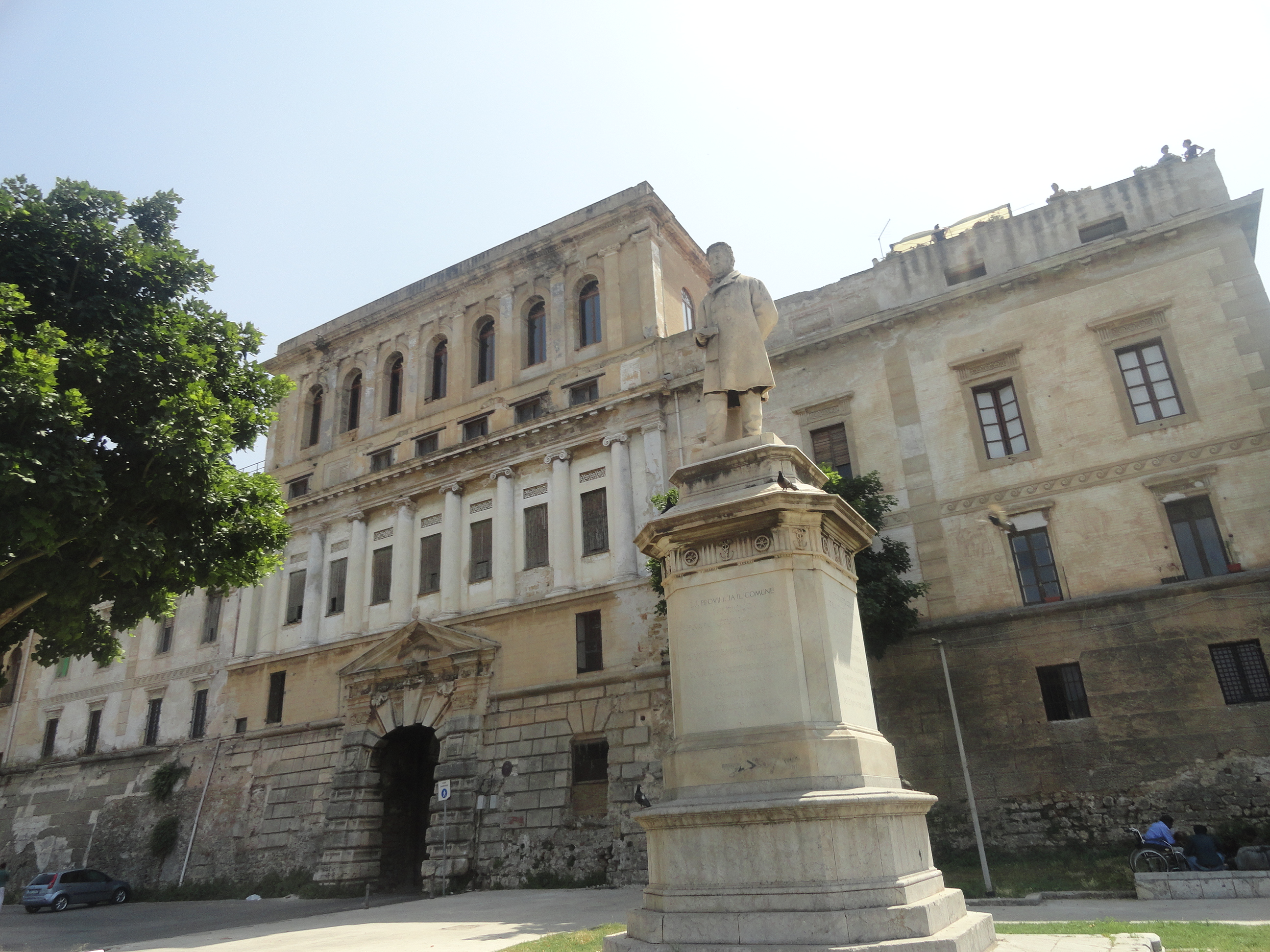
- Façade from the seaside with Monument to Vincenzo Florio
- Interactive map of the Palazzo Forcella de Seta area

General information
- Location: Palermo, Italy, Italy
- Coordinates: 38.11617°N 13.37398°E

The Palazzo Forcella de Seta is an eclectic-style aristocratic palace located along the Mediterranean seafront in the historic Kalsa quarter of central Palermo, Sicily, Italy. The palace is built atop remnants of the Porta dei Greci (1553), through which via Romano Giuseppe runs through. Some refer to the entire structure as the gate itself. To the seaside, stretches part of the park Foro Italico. Vincenzo Florio Sr..

== History ==
An opening in the walls towards the sea existed at this site as early as 14th-century, in a neighborhood historically inhabited by Greeks. A church named San Nicolò dei Greci–also known as San Nicolò la Carruba once stood in this area. Both the church and the original gate were replaced in 1553 by orders of the Senate of Palermo. For a brief period, the gate was known as Porta d'Africa, after Viceroy Giovanni de Vega installed a metal gate looted during the Capture of Madia in 1550. This gate, along with the bastions that once flanked it, no longer exists.

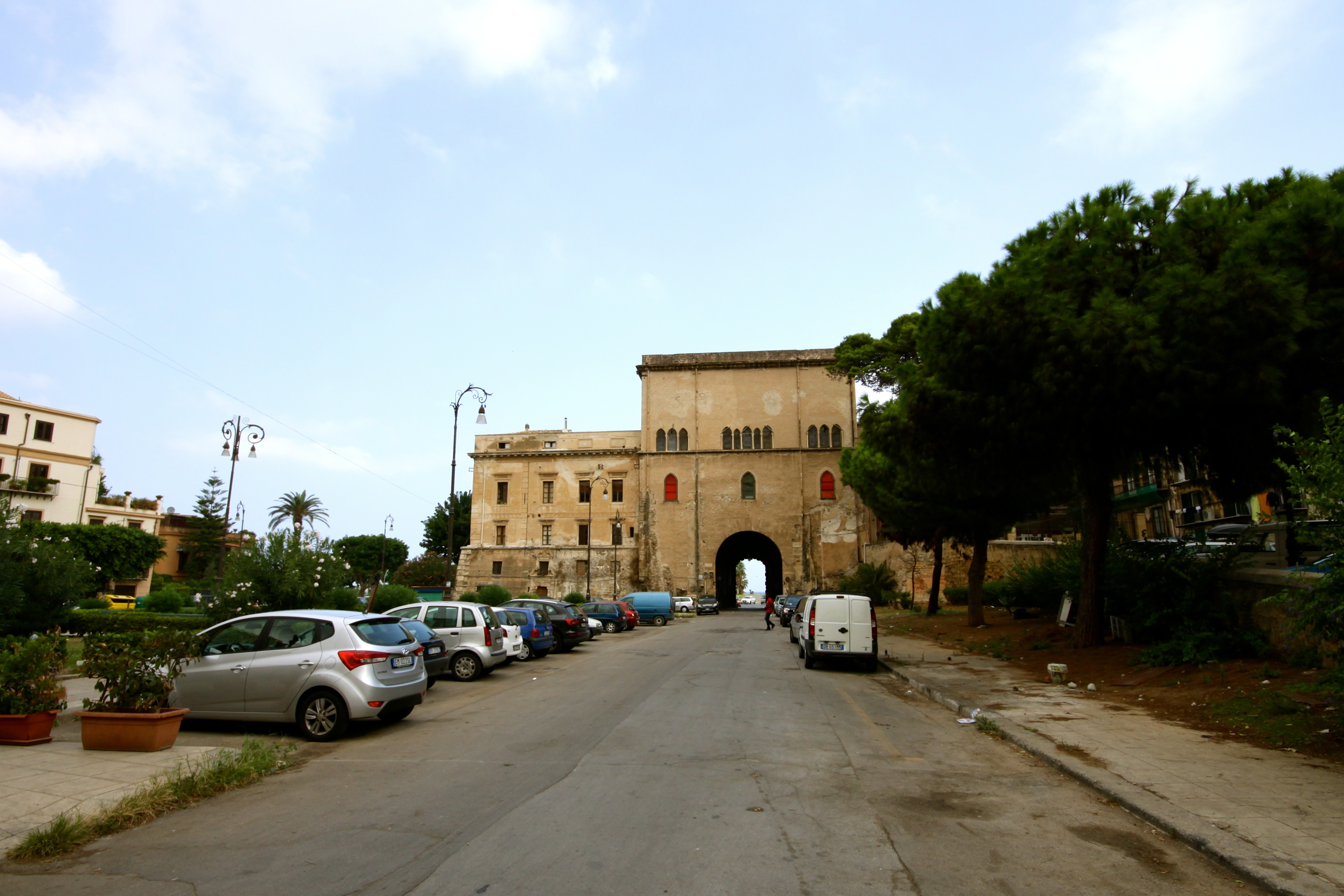
View of Porta dei Greci from land-side

The current palace building was constructed atop the ruins of the former casina a mare (seaside villa) of the Bonnano family, Princess of Cattolica. That villa suffered significant damage during the rebellions of 1820. In1833, the property was purchased by Marchese Enrico Carlo Forcella, who commissioned the reconstruction of the building with an additional floor. Architects Emmanuel Palazzotto and Nicolò Puglia oversaw the project, which incorporated an electric mix of architectural elements, drawing from Romanesque, Moorish, Gothic, and Neoclassical styles. In the early 20th century, the building was acquired by Marchese Francesco De Seta. It subsequently served as the headquarters of the Associazione di Costruttori Edile ed Affini di Palermo (ANCE Palermo).

The Palazzo Forcella De Seta was used as a venue for Manifesta 12 in 2018. In 2025, Hauser & Wirth acquired the building to use it as a gallery space.
