= Gioacchino Vitagliano =

Italian sculptor

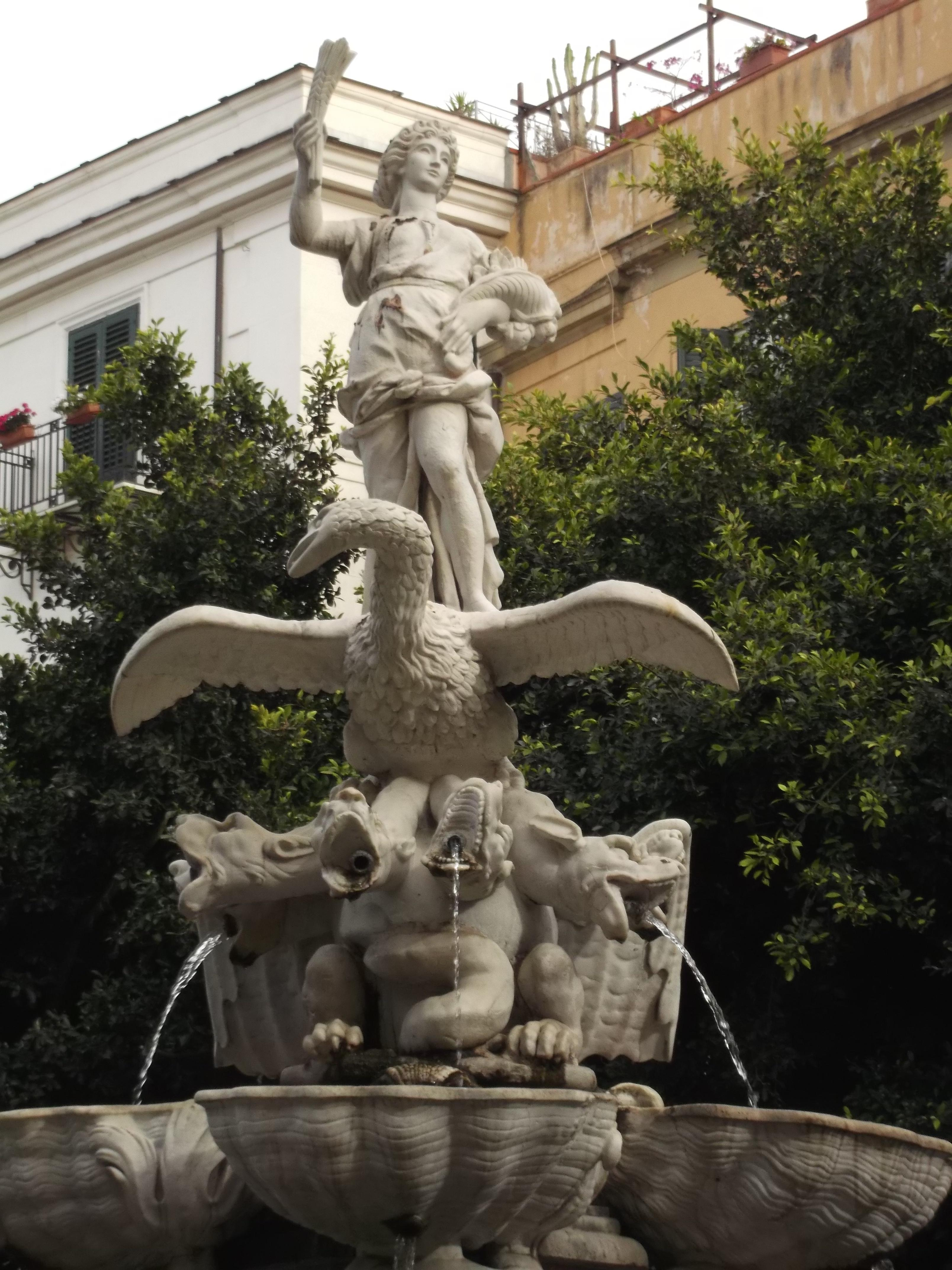
Fontana del Garraffo

Gioacchino Vitagliano (1669 – 27 April 1739) was a Sicilian Baroque sculptor. He was born and died in Palermo.

He trained under Giacomo Serpotta, and married Serpotta's daughter. He sculpted the Fontana del Garraffo in Palermo. He also created reliefs and sculptures for the Church of the Gesu and the Chapel of the Rosary in the church of Santa Cita.
