= Santa Maria dello Spasimo =

Church building in Palermo, Italy

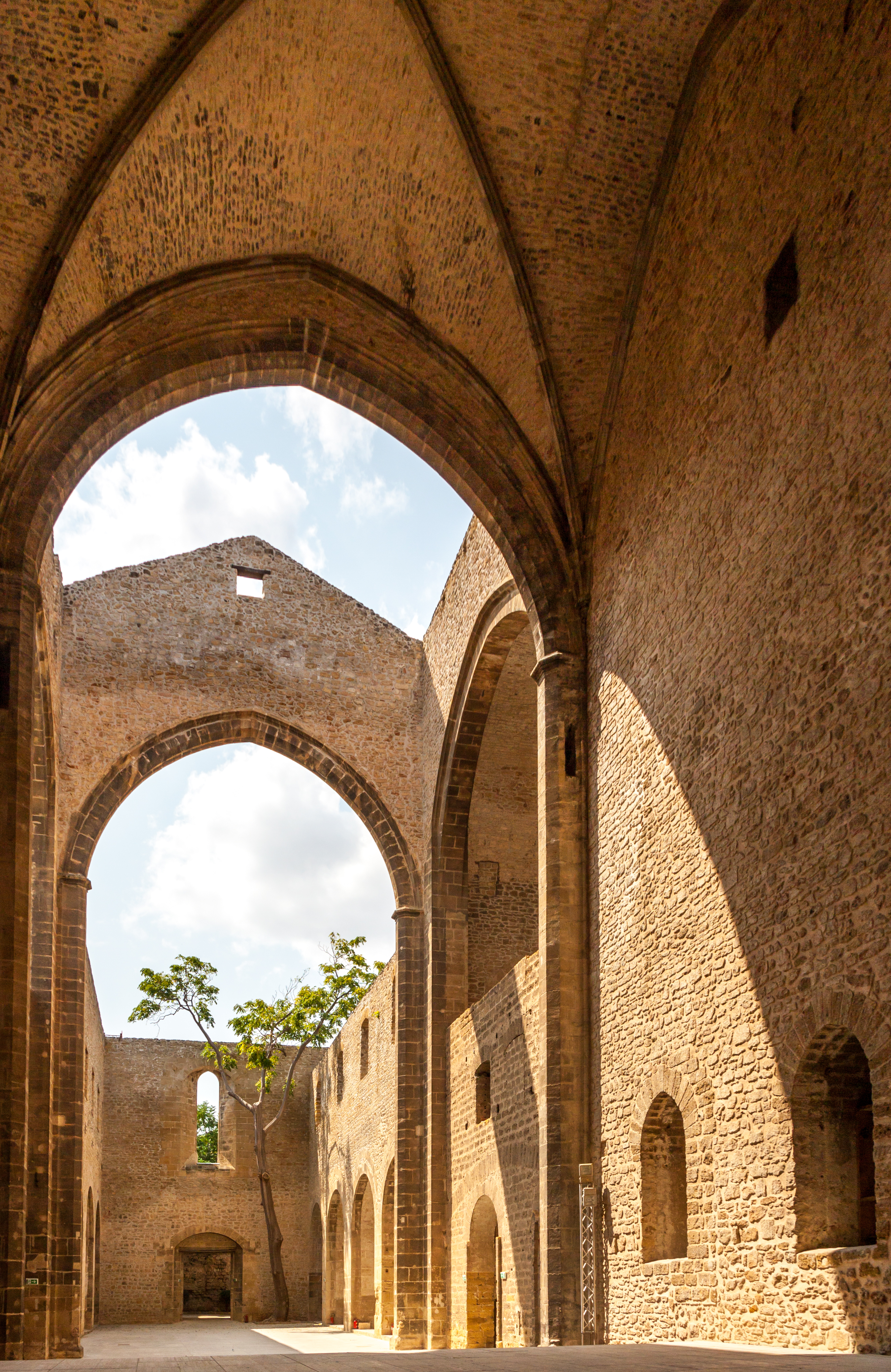
- Santa Maria dello Spasimo
- 38°06′51″N 13°22′19″E
- Country: Italy
- Denomination: Catholic

History
- Founded: 1509

Santa Maria dello Spasimo, or Lo Spasimo, is an unfinished Catholic church in the Kalsa neighborhood in Palermo, Sicily, on Via dello Spasimo.

Construction of the church and accompanying monastery of the Olivetan Order began in 1509 with a papal bull from Julius II, on land bequeathed by Giacomo Basilicò, a lawyer and the widower of a rich noblewoman. The Spasimo or Swoon of the Virgin was a controversial idea in late medieval and Renaissance Catholic devotion. The church commissioned the painting by Raphael, Christ Falling on the Way to Calvary, or Lo Spasimo di Sicilia, as it is also known. This was completed in Rome in about 1514–165, but in 1622 the Spanish Viceroy of Naples twisted arms and obtained its sale to Philip IV of Spain, and it is now in the Museo del Prado in Madrid.

The church was never completed because of the rising Turkish threat in 1535, where resources meant for the church were diverted to fortifications of the city against any possible incursions. Even in its unfinished states, Lo Spasimo shows the late Gothic style architecture that permeated building practices in Palermo at the time as well as the Spanish influence in the city.

The church now hosts open air musical, theatrical and cultural events because of its lack of a roof.

== Sources ==
- Penny, Nicholas, National Gallery Catalogues (new series): The Sixteenth Century Italian Paintings, Volume I, 2004, National Gallery Publications Ltd, ISBN 1-85709-908-7
- Bellafiore, Giuseppe. Palermo: guida della città e dei dintorni. Palermo, 1990. (reprinted several times)
- De Seta, Cesare. Palermo città d'arte: Guida illustrata ai monumenti di Palermo e Monreale. Kalós. Palermo, 2009. (pp. 222–223)
- La Fisca, Anna Maria and Giovanni Palazzo. Santa Maria dello Spasimo. Edizioni Guida. Palermo, 1997.
