= Kalsa =

Historical quarter of the Italian city of Palermo in Sicily

Coordinates: 38°06′58″N 13°22′08″E

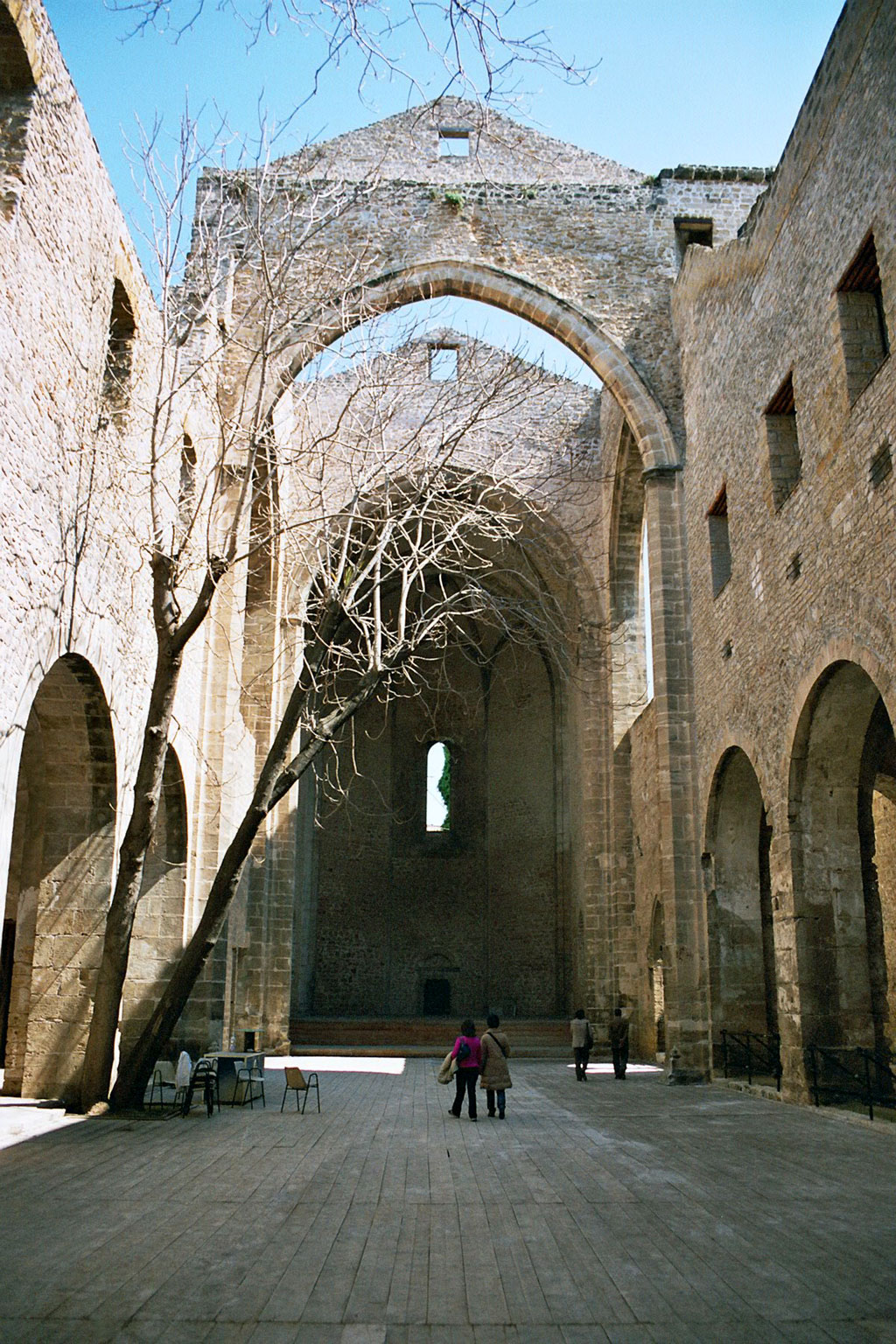
Chiesa di Santa Maria dello Spasimo in Kalsa

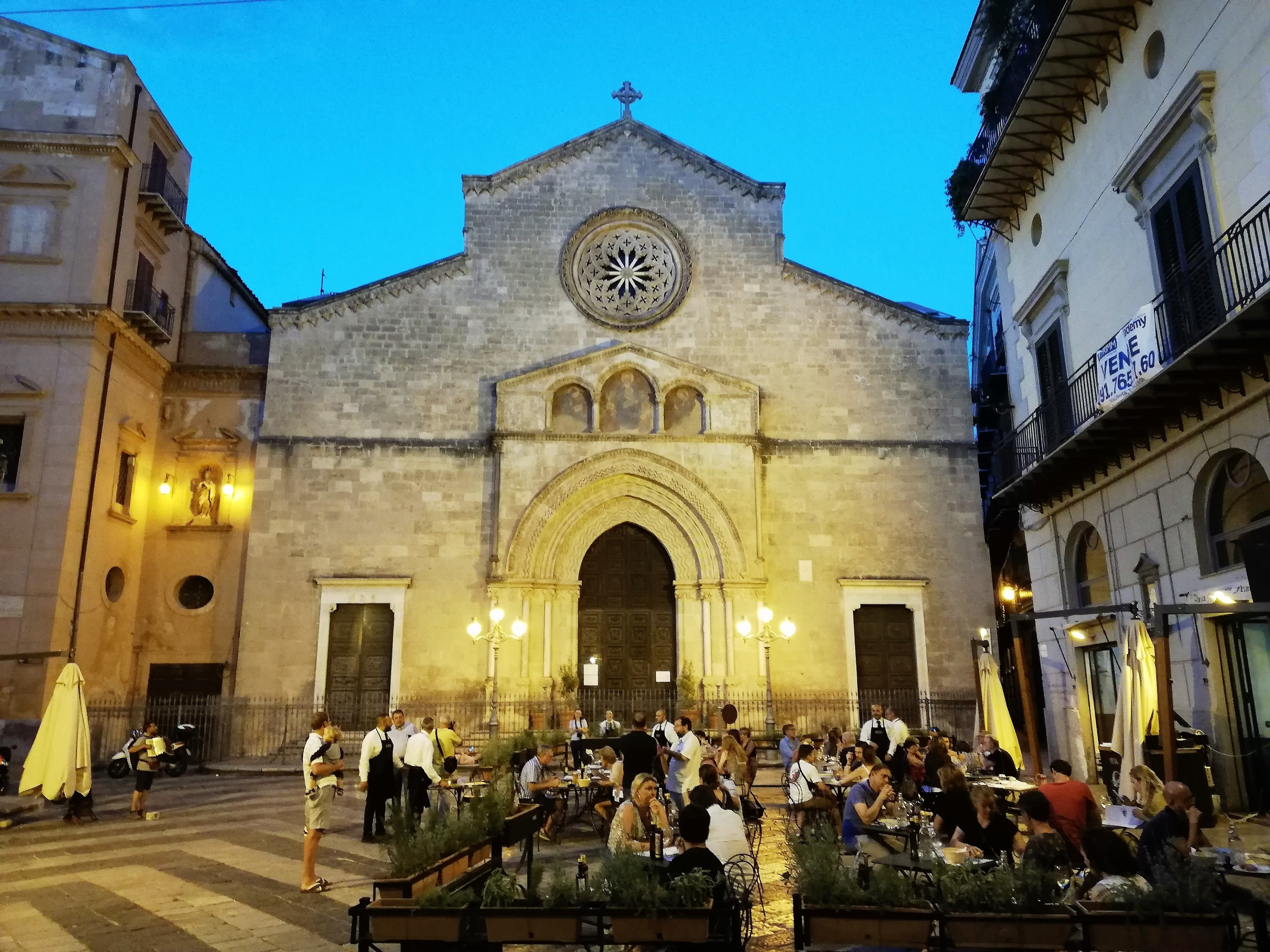
Festa Santa Rosalia

Kalsa or Mandamento Tribunali is a historical quarter of the Italian city of Palermo in Sicily. It is sometimes referred to as la Kalsa or the Kalsa.

== Names ==
The common name of the quarter, Kalsa, derives from the district's historic Arabic name, al-Khāliṣa (الخالصة), meaning "the chosen one". The formal name of the quarter, Mandamento Tribunali, meaning "district of courts", derives from the presence of Inquisition courts at the Palazzo Chiaramonte-Steri.

== History ==
=== Ancient history ===
In ancient times, most of the area now known as the Kalsa was underwater. Hamilcar and Hannibal used to dock their ships there as they prepared their attacks on the Greek city of Himera. The walls of a Punic city occupied by the Phoenicians and Carthaginians once extended to the confluence of the Papyrus and Kemonia rivers, near what is now the intersection of Via Roma and Via Vittorio Emanuele.

=== Middle Ages ===
Built in the ninth century, Al-Khalesa was one of the first planned Arab settlements in Europe. It was the administrative center of the city of Balarm (Palermo), which was under Arab rule until it was conquered by the Normans in 1072. Around 937, the Arabs moved their base from Al-Kasr (today the Cassaro, or castle district) to Al-Khalesa and built a fortified palace near the port.

In the 970s, Palermo expanded into a major Muslim city comparable to Cairo or Córdoba. In addition to housing the emir and his court, Al-Khalesa contained the arsenal and prison, baths, a mosque, and government offices. There were no shops or markets in the area. It was surrounded by a stone wall with four gates, the best known being the Bab al-bahr or Marine Gate, on the shore.

The center of Al-Khalesa was located near what is now Piazza Kalsa. Much of the square's current "Arabesque" architecture, such as the Greek Gate, is the product of 16th-century Spanish Moorish revival movements and cannot be traced directly to the emirate of Balarm. The area still has narrow, winding streets, as it did in the 11th century.

After the Normans captured Palermo, they preferred to move their headquarters to higher ground, back to the Cassaro. The Kalsa became an Arab neighborhood with markets and mosques, but eventually, just as in the rest of Sicily, Islam would disappear from the island by the early 13th century.

=== World War II and later ===
The Kalsa district was heavily bombed during World War II, particularly during the Allied air raids of 1943, and remained largely abandoned for decades. It attracted poor squatters, many of whom lived in the bombed-out ruins. Sicilian-American novelist Dodici Azpadu describes it as an "Arab ghetto." For over 40 years the rubbled district suffered from severe structural neglect, poverty, and isolation from Palermo's economic growth. The neighborhood began a significant turning point in the mid-1990s, driven in part by civic reactions to the 1992 assassinations of anti-Mafia prosecutors Giovanni Falcone and Paolo Borsellino, both of whom grew up in the district. Under the administration of Mayor Leoluca Orlando, the municipality launched major urban renewal initiatives to reclaim the historic quarter from decay and crime. Bomb-damaged landmarks, such as the Palazzo Kalsa, were structurally restored and repurposed into contemporary art centers and cultural venues. The area has since been revitalized and is home to art galleries, restored churches and palaces, and other tourist attractions.

== Geography ==
Kalsa is delimited by:

- Via Maqueda to the west
- Via Lincoln to the south
- Foro Italico to the east
- Via Vittorio Emanuele or Cassaro to the north

== Culture ==
On summer evenings, Kals'art, an arts festival, is held in the streets of Kalsa.

=== Sights ===
==== Monuments ====
Churches

- Chiesa di San Francesco
- Chiesa della Martorana
- Basilica La Magione
- Lo Spasimo
- San Cataldo
- La Gancia
- Chiesa di San Giovanni dei Napoletani
- Chiesa della Santissima Pietà
- Santa Teresa
- Santa Maria dell'Itria dei Cocchieri

City gates

- Porta Felice

Palaces

- Palazzo Abatellis
- Palazzo Butera
- Palazzo Chiaramonte-Steri
- Palazzo Forcella de Seta
- Palazzo Mirto
- Palazzetto Mirto
- Palazzo Sant'Elia (già "Palazzo del Marchese Santa Croce")
- Palazzo Trabucco della Torretta
- Hotel Patria (già Palazzo Naselli d'Aragona)

Theatres

- Teatro Santa Cecilia
- Teatro Garibaldi
- Teatro Bellini
- Teatro Montevergini

Public squares

- Piazza Marina
- Piazza della Magione
- Piazza Kalsa

Fountains

- Fontana del Genio
- Fontana Pretoria

Oratories

- Oratorio dei Bianchi
- Oratorio di San Lorenzo

Other sights

- Museo delle marionette
- Passeggiata delle Cattive
- Via Roma (Palermo)
- Chiesa di Santa Maria dello Spasimo (auditorium)

== Notable people ==
- Dodici Azpadu, New-York born American novelist. Her family emigrated from Kalsa.
- Paolo Borsellino, anti-Mafia judge.
- Tommaso Buscetta, Mafia boss and pentito.
- Giovanni Falcone, anti-Mafia judge.
- Leandro Rinaudo, football player and manager.
