= Bombing of Palermo in World War II =

Bombing of Palermo
- Part of World War II
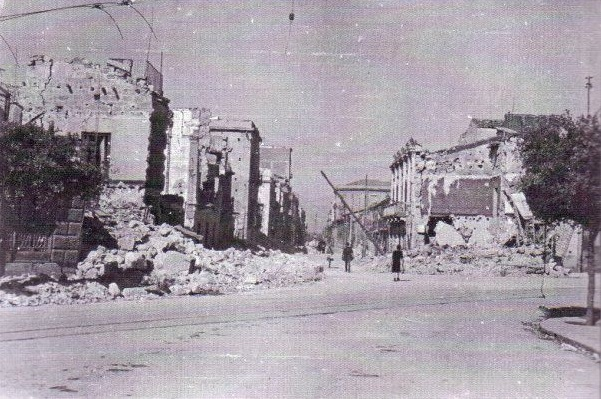
- A bomb-damaged street in Palermo
Date	June 1940 – July 1943
Location	Palermo, Kingdom of Italy

Belligerents
United States; United Kingdom	Kingdom of Italy

During World War II the Italian city of Palermo, the regional capital and largest city of Sicily, was heavily bombed by both the Royal Air Force and the United States Army Air Force.

== Background ==
Palermo was a target of strategic importance for several reasons: its port was a base for Italian naval light forces and a point of transit, and sometimes of departure, for ships and convoys carrying supplies to North Africa; it housed a shipyard and the Boccadifalco air base, used by both the Regia Aeronautica and the Luftwaffe.

The city was defended by anti-aircraft batteries located on Mount Pellegrino, Pizzo Volo d’Aquila and along the coast, and by fighter planes based at the nearby Boccadifalco airfield. Two German radars, a Freya located on Cape Gallo and a Würzburg, were used for aircraft detection.

== 1940–1942 ==
The first air raid on Palermo was carried out on 23 June 1940, one day before the signing of the Armistice of Villa Incisa, by fifteen French bombers; twenty-five civilians were killed. This was the only air raid suffered by Palermo in 1940, but from January 1941 British bombers based in Malta started attacking its harbour with increasing frequency. During the following two years, Palermo was the second most bombed city in southern Italy, after Naples; the main raids took place on 8 and 10 January 1941, 6, 10 and 31 July 1941, 8, 9, 12, 25, 26 and 29 September 1941, 21 and 31 October 1941, 2 and 4 February 1942, 2 March 1942 and 24 November 1942. Most of these raids, however, were carried out with small numbers of medium bombers, and generally caused little damage and few casualties. Exceptions were the raids of September 1941, that killed 70 people; the raid on 4 February 1942, which caused a hundred civilian deaths; and the raid on 2 March 1942 (by sixteen Vickers Wellingtons), when four ships were sunk in harbour and several more damaged. One of the ships sunk in this raid, the German freighter Cuma, was loaded with fuel and ammunition and blew up, causing widespread damage to the port facilities and to several buildings in the city, hit by fragments of every shape and size. There were several dozen casualties, mostly among the crews of the ships in the harbour.

== 1943 ==
The situation drastically changed in early 1943, when Palermo became a target for USAAF bombers operating from newly conquered bases in French North Africa. The USAAF used larger numbers of bombers, and frequently made use of Boeing B-17 and Consolidated B-24 heavy bombers as opposed to the medium bombers previously used by the British. Air raids on Palermo escalated in both frequency and intensity, initially as the Allies sought to hamper the use of its harbour for supply convoys bound for Tunisia, and later in preparation for the invasion of Sicily.

The first USAAF raid took place on 7 January 1943, when ten bombers of the 9th Air Force (out of 25 that had taken off from air bases in North Africa) attacked the harbour, sinking the destroyer Bersagliere; many bombs also fell on the city centre, killing 139 civilians. Another raid on the port took place on 23 January; on 3 February, thirty B-17s of the 9th Air Force attacked again the harbour, and again the bombs fell all over the waterfront and the old city centre, killing 98 people and wounding nearly 300. Two days later, the RAF attacked Palermo, hitting the Mondello and San Lorenzo districts; the raid was repeated on 8 February. On 15 February, bombers of the 12th Air Force attacked again the harbour and hit the shipyard, but many bombs fell on the city, killing 226 civilians. On 20 February, the RAF attacked the Boccadifalco air base, but the suburbs of Palermo were also hit; the same happened two nights later.

On 1 March 1943, thirty-six bombers of the 12th Air Force dropped 94 tons of bombs over the harbour: the objective was hit, disabling the drydock and sinking the destroyer Geniere and some smaller vessels, but once again part of the bombs fell on the city, hitting among other things the Cathedral. On the following night, the RAF renewed the attack; on 2 March the USAAF attacked again the harbour, followed on 8 and 11 March by the RAF, which hit the city. On 22 March, twenty-four U. S. bombers of the 12th Air Force dropped 264 bombs over the harbour; most of the bombs hit the target, sinking six merchant ships and several smaller vessels and damaging many more, including the destroyer Granatiere. One of the merchant vessels, Volta, was loaded with ammunition and exploded, causing further damage to the harbour. 38 civilians lost their lives, in addition to several dozen military personnel and merchant seamen.

On the night between 4 and 5 April, the RAF attacked Palermo; during this raid, the churches of Santissimo Salvatore and of San Francesco Saverio were hit. On the following day, the 12th Air Force bombed the harbour and the Boccadifalco air base, killing nine people. On 7, 10 and 12 April Palermo was attacked by the 9th Air Force and by the RAF. On 16 April, Palermo was bombed by B-17s, causing 92 deaths; the raid was repeated on the following day, when the entire area surrounding the harbour was heavily bombed, hitting the Foro Italico and the Castellammare, Tribunali and Ponte Ammiraglio districts. On 17 April, 48 USAAF bombers dropped 130 tons of bombs on the harbour, rendering it unusable for several weeks, and on the following day another 75 bombers hit the Brancaccio and Ucciardone marshalling yards, as well as the tram depot, causing twenty civilian casualties.

On 9 May, Palermo suffered the heaviest and bloodiest raid of the entire war: 211 bombers of the 12th Air Force dropped 315 tons of bombs, targeting the harbour and the marshalling yard, but many of the bombs fell all over the city, causing widespread destruction and 373 deaths among the population. Four days later, a raid by the RAF caused another seventeen victims; on 25 May, the USAAF attacked the Boccadifalco air base.

On 12 June, Palermo was bombed by 39 bombers of the 12th Air Force, targeting the Boccadifalco airfield; this raid caused 25 victims. Further attacks on the air base followed on 12 June and 15 June (five civilian deaths). On 30 June, another USAAF raid on the Boccadifalco air base resulted once again in bombs hitting the city (the University and the hospital were among the damaged buildings) and causing 84 victims. On 1 July, an RAF raid damaged the Palazzo dei Normanni and caused a further thirty-two deaths; another attack followed five days later, and on 14 July, four days after the Allied landings, Palermo was bombed by 24 9th Air Force bombers.

== Aftermath ==
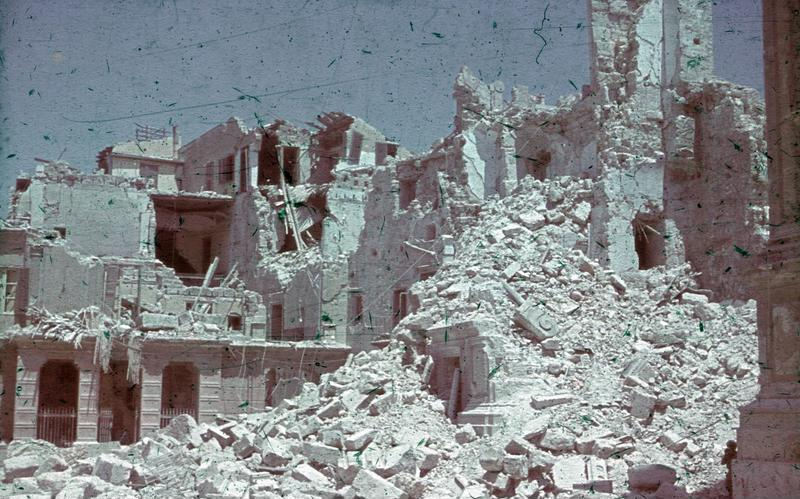
Destroyed buildings in Palermo after USAAF bombings, July 1943

On 22 July 1943, during the Allied invasion of Sicily, Palermo was captured by U.S. troops of General Geoffrey Keyes' "Provisional Corps", part of George S. Patton's Seventh Army. This brought an end to Allied bombing raids, but the American-occupied city became now a target for the Regia Aeronautica and the Luftwaffe, which carried out several raids during the following month. The last Axis air raid took place on 23 August 1943, six days after the end of land operations in Sicily; a few weeks later, the Armistice of Cassibile ended the hostilities between Italy and the Allies, and forced the Luftwaffe to withdraw from its bases in southern Italy. Air raids on Palermo, from either side, had finally come to an end; in three years, the city had been bombed by five different air forces – French, British, American, Italian, and German.

The raids caused heavy damage to the city. According to the 1949 issue of the Treccani Encyclopedia, over 100,000 rooms had been destroyed or damaged. 40 % of the pre-war housing stock was lost; 69,000 rooms were rendered uninhabitable, leaving 60,000 people homeless in the city centre alone. The most damaged areas were the ones located near the port, target of many Allied raids; the Borgo Vecchio and San Pietro alla Cala districts were almost completely destroyed. After the occupation, the Allied Military Government dumped the rubble into the sea near the Foro Italico; this created an artificial beach with an area of 40,000 square meters. Several unrepaired bomb-damaged buildings survive to this day: for instance in Corso Vittorio Emanuele, near Piazza Marina and near Ballarò.

Cultural heritage suffered greatly; many Norman, Renaissance and Baroque palaces and churches in the old city centre were destroyed or badly damaged, including the Basilica of the Most Holy Trinity, the church of San Francesco, Palazzo Sclafani, the church of Santa Maria della Catena, the church of San Giorgio dei Genovesi, Palazzo Abatellis, the church of Sant'Ignazio all'Olivella, the church of the Gesù, the church of San Giuseppe dei Teatini, the church of Santissimo Salvatore. Others suffered less serious damage, including the Cathedral, the Royal Palace of Palermo, the Porta Felice, the churches of San Giovanni degli Eremiti, San Giovanni dei Lebbrosi and of the Holy Spirit. Altogether, 119 historic buildings (twenty palaces, thirteen public buildings and 86 churches) suffered damage; eleven were completely destroyed, nineteen partially destroyed, twelve badly damaged, fifty-four damaged, and twenty-three lightly damaged.

Civilian casualties from the air raids amounted to 2,123 dead and several thousand wounded.

== Bibliography ==
- Albergoni Attilio, Vincenzo Crisafulli, Palermo Immagini della memoria 1937 - 1947, Vittorietti editore, Palermo, 2013. ISBN 978-88-7231-169-1.
- Albergoni Attilio, La guerra dell'Arte con la cronologia dei bombardamenti su Palermo, Sopr. BB.CC. e AA. Palermo, Navarra Editore, 2017. ISBN 978-88-98865-76-5.
- Albergoni Attilio, "Palermo Bombs Away" Cronologia completa dei bombardamenti su palermo, ISBN 979-12-210-4021-0.
- Bellomo Alessandro, Picciotto Clara, Bombe su Palermo: cronaca degli attacchi aerei 1940-1943, Associazione culturale Italia, Genova, 2008
- Romeo Samuel, Rothier Wilfried, Bombardamenti su Palermo: un racconto per immagini, Istituto poligrafico europeo, Palermo, 2017
