= Cassaro, Palermo =

Most ancient street of Palermo, Italy

Cassaro Via Vittorio Emanuele II
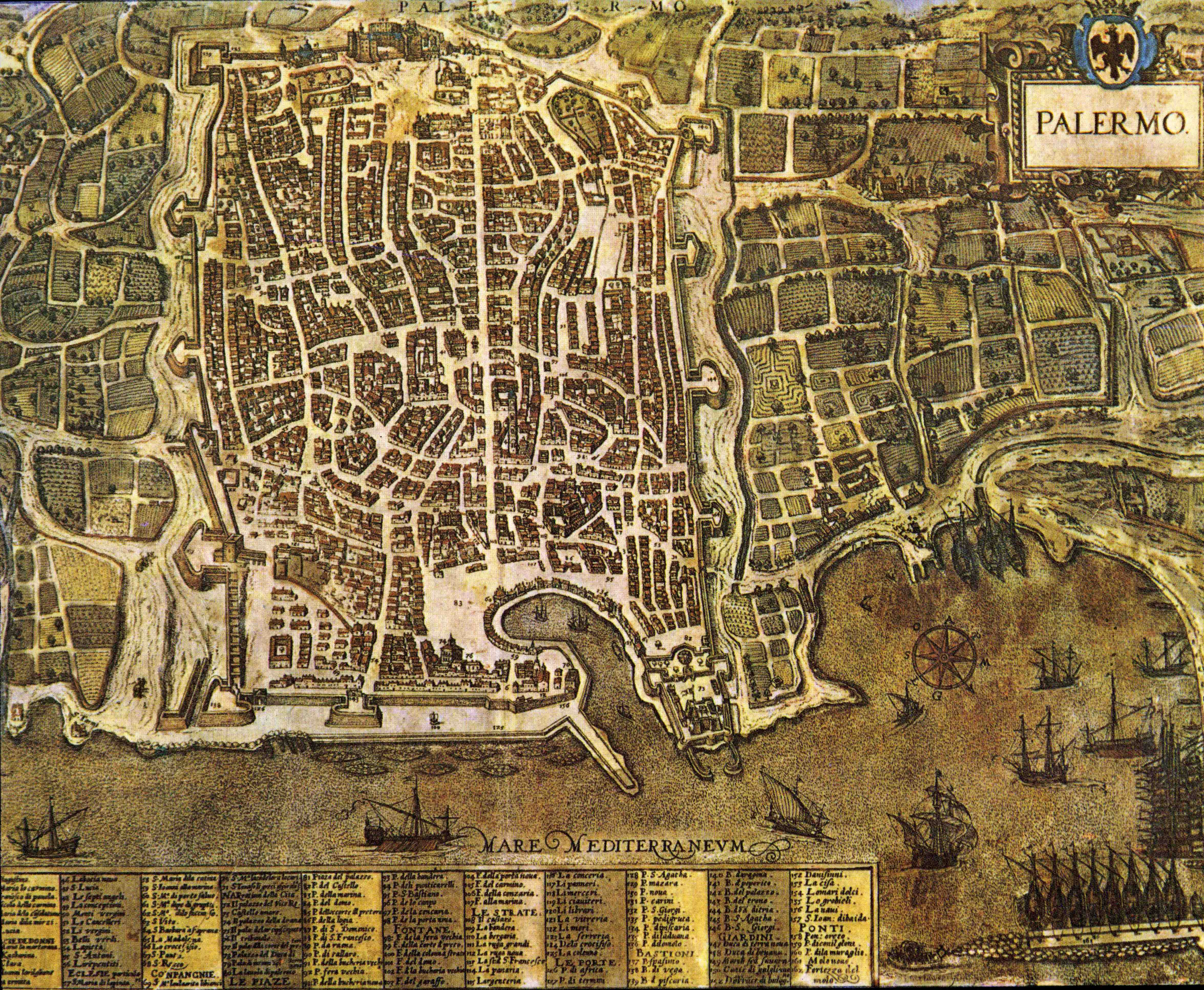
- View of Palermo (plate n. 56) from Volume 4 of Civitates Orbis Terrarum. Cassaro appears as the long road in the middle of the city.
- Interactive map of Cassaro; Via Vittorio Emanuele II
- Native name: u Càssaru (Sicilian)
- Former name(s): As-Simat Al-Balat, Platea Marmorea, Via Toledo
- Length: 1.8 km (1.1 mi)
- Location: Palermo, Sicily, Italy
- Coordinates: Quattro Canti: 38°06′57″N 13°21′41″E

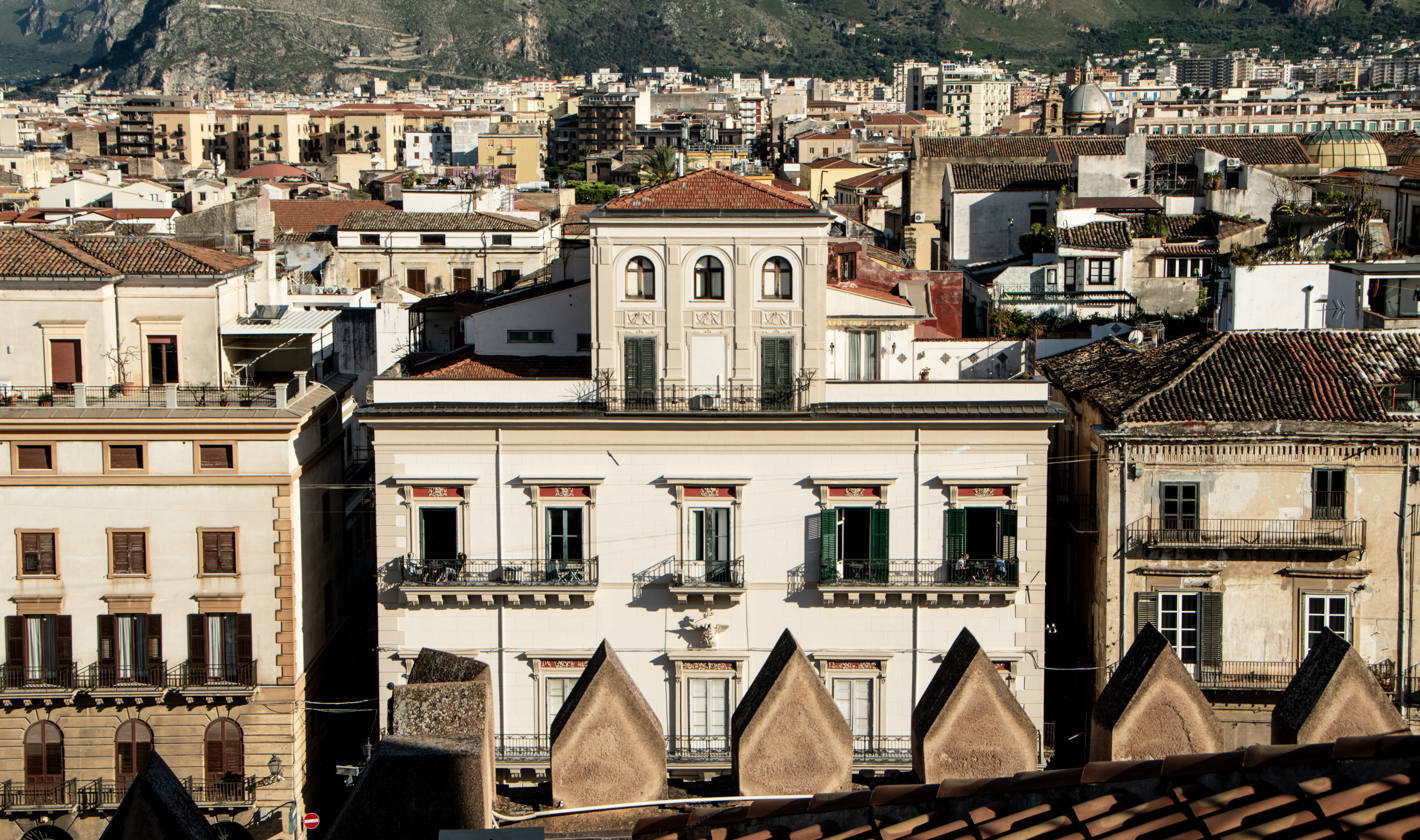
Buildings along the Cassaro, as viewed from Palermo Cathedral

The Cassaro (Italian: [ˈkassaro]; Sicilian: u Càssaru) is the most ancient street of Palermo. From the late 16th century the street also had the name Via Toledo. Following the unification of Italy, it was officially renamed Via Vittorio Emanuele II (or Corso Vittorio Emanuele II), but the old and distinctive name is still in use. The street is rooted in the age of the foundation of Palermo by the Phoenicians. It provides access to a number of important sights, including the Royal Palace (also known as Palazzo dei Normanni) and the Cathedral, two UNESCO World Heritage Sites.

== Toponymy ==
The name Cassaro comes from the Arabic word qaṣr (قصر, 'fortress, castle'). In fact, during the era of the Islamic Sicily, Panormus, called Balarm by the Saracens, became the island's capital and a large portion of the ancient city was widely fortified. In the Middle Ages, especially during the Islamic and Norman periods, the street was also called Simat al-Balāṭ (Arabic) and Via (Platea) Marmorea (Latin) because it was paved with slabs of marble. Even now, the word balata, from Arabic balāṭa, is used in Sicily to indicate the marble.

In the late sixteenth century, during the age of the personal union between the crowns of Spain and Sicily, the street assumed the name of Via Toledo in honor of the Viceroy García de Toledo Osorio, the main architect of its rectification. This denomination lasted until the unification of Italy, when the street was officially dedicated to the King Victor Emmanuel II of Italy. However, the ancient name Cassaro was never abandoned by the people.

== History ==
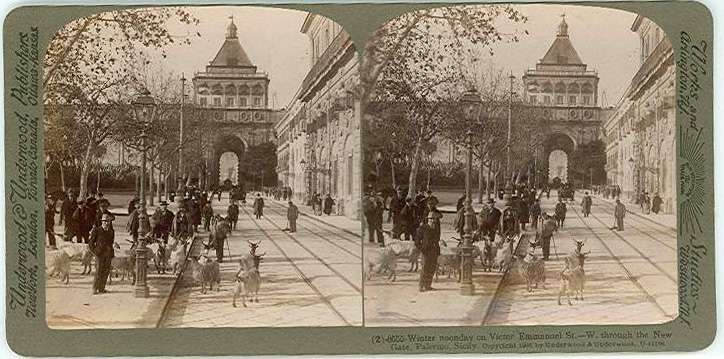
Underwood & Underwood, Winter Noonday on Victor Emmanuel St.—W. Through the New Gate, Palermo, Sicily, Italy. 1906

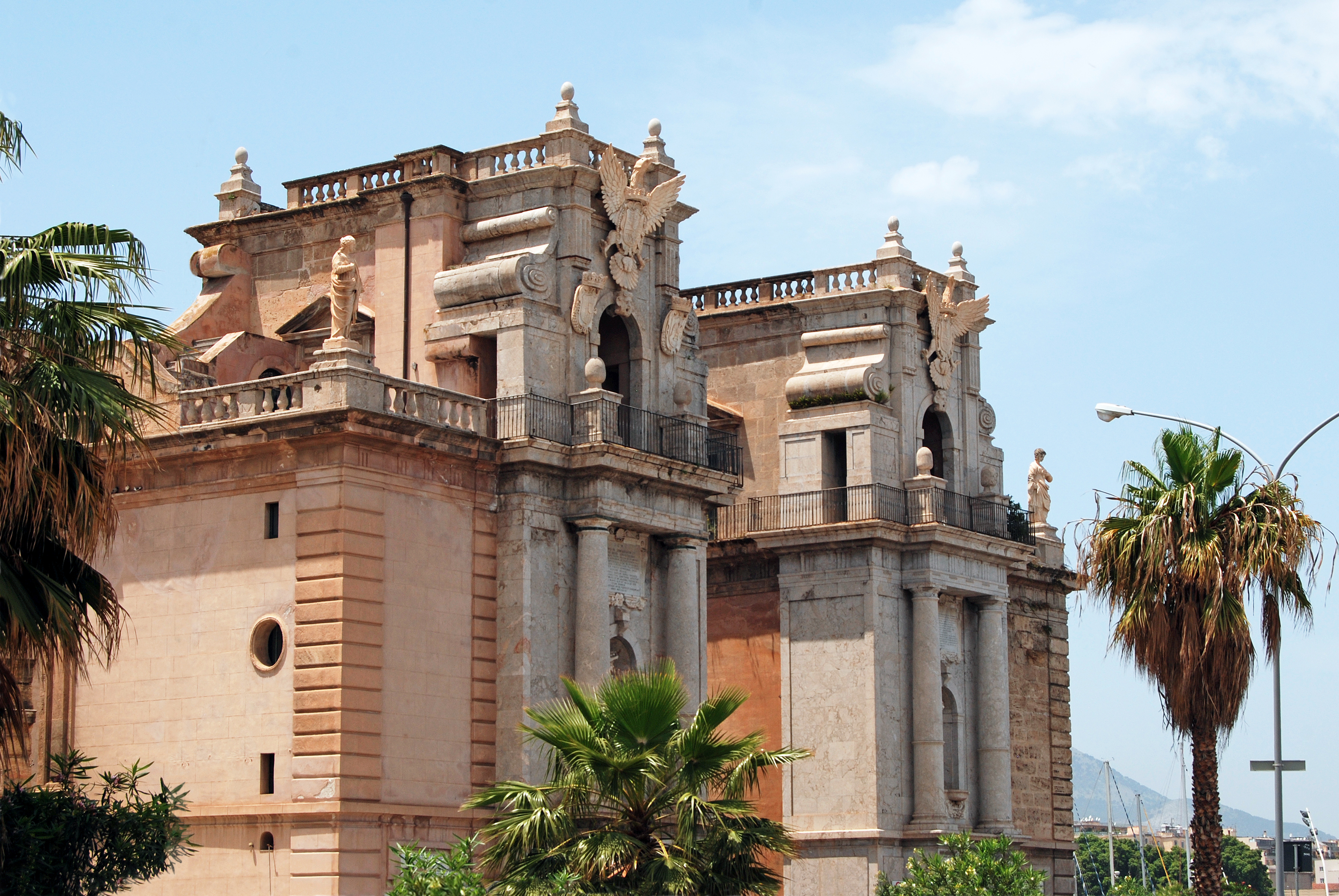
Porta Felice, entrance of the Cassaro from the sea

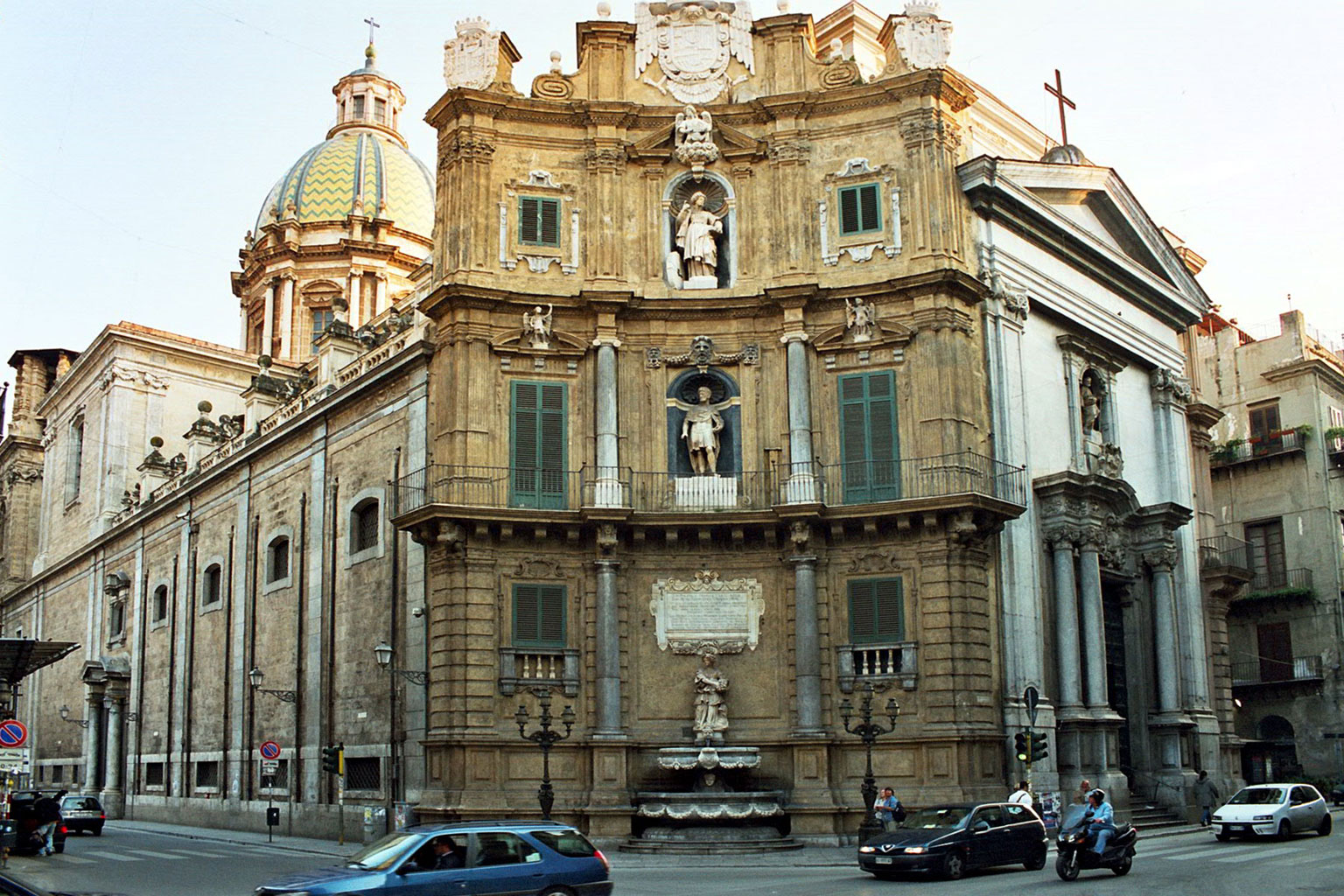
Quattro Canti, direction south, and Church of San Giuseppe dei Teatini

The road was created at the time of the foundation of Palermo by the Phoenicians, cutting into two parts the city and connecting the ancient port to the Punic necropolis located in the area of the current Piazza Indipendenza and Corso Calatafimi.

During the Islamic era the street confirmed its role of main axis of the city, from which various branch detached as secondary roads called darbi, perpendicular to the main branch, inserting in the territory and ending in aziqqa (أزقة), blind alleys distinctive of Palermo. During the Siculo-Norman age the Cassaro was richly described by the Muslim geographer Al-Idrisi in his famous Book of Roger.

The most important innovation to the layout of the Cassaro occurred in the second half of the sixteenth century, during the Spaniard age. The project, maybe defined from the outset but accomplished in various stages, provided for the rectification and enlargement of the street up to the Church of Santa Maria di Porto Salvo, near Palazzo Chiaramonte (at that time headquarters of the Viceroy).

The works, with the permission of the Viceroy Garcia de Toledo, began in 1567. It started with the adjustment of the southern area till Porta dei Patitelli (current Via Roma), then with massive demolitions to reach Piazza Marina. The development of this work was actively supported by the city nobility, that contributed to the opening of Piazza Bologni and Piazza Pretoria. In 1581 The Viceroy Marcantonio Colonna prolonged the street up to the city walls by opening the sea with the monumental Porta Felice.

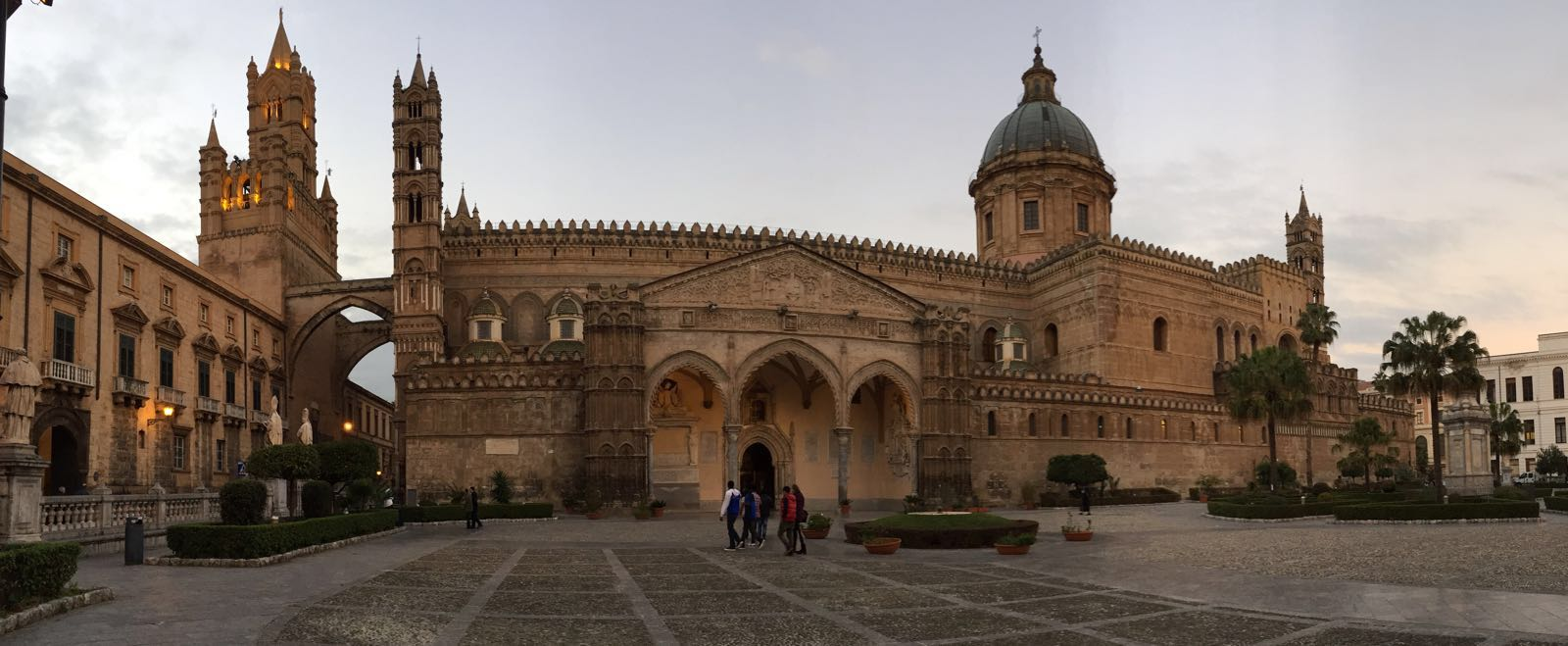
View of Palermo Cathedral from the Cassaro

== Structure ==
The street is perfectly straight from Porta Nuova, near Piazza Indipendenza, to Porta Felice, near the Foro Italico. It has a slight downhill sloping towards the sea. Throughout its path there are many streets leading into it but only two crossing: Via Maqueda (also known as Strada Nuova), with which it forms the famous Baroque intersection known as Quattro Canti (Piazza Villena), and Via Roma, created in the late nineteenth century.

== Transport ==
Since 2015 the street is pedestrian in the stretch from the Cathedral to Quattro Canti. A free shuttle bus, called Free Centro Storico or Arancione ('Orange'), crosses the historic centre from Piazza Indipendenza to Porta Felice.

== Places of interest ==
Royal Palace

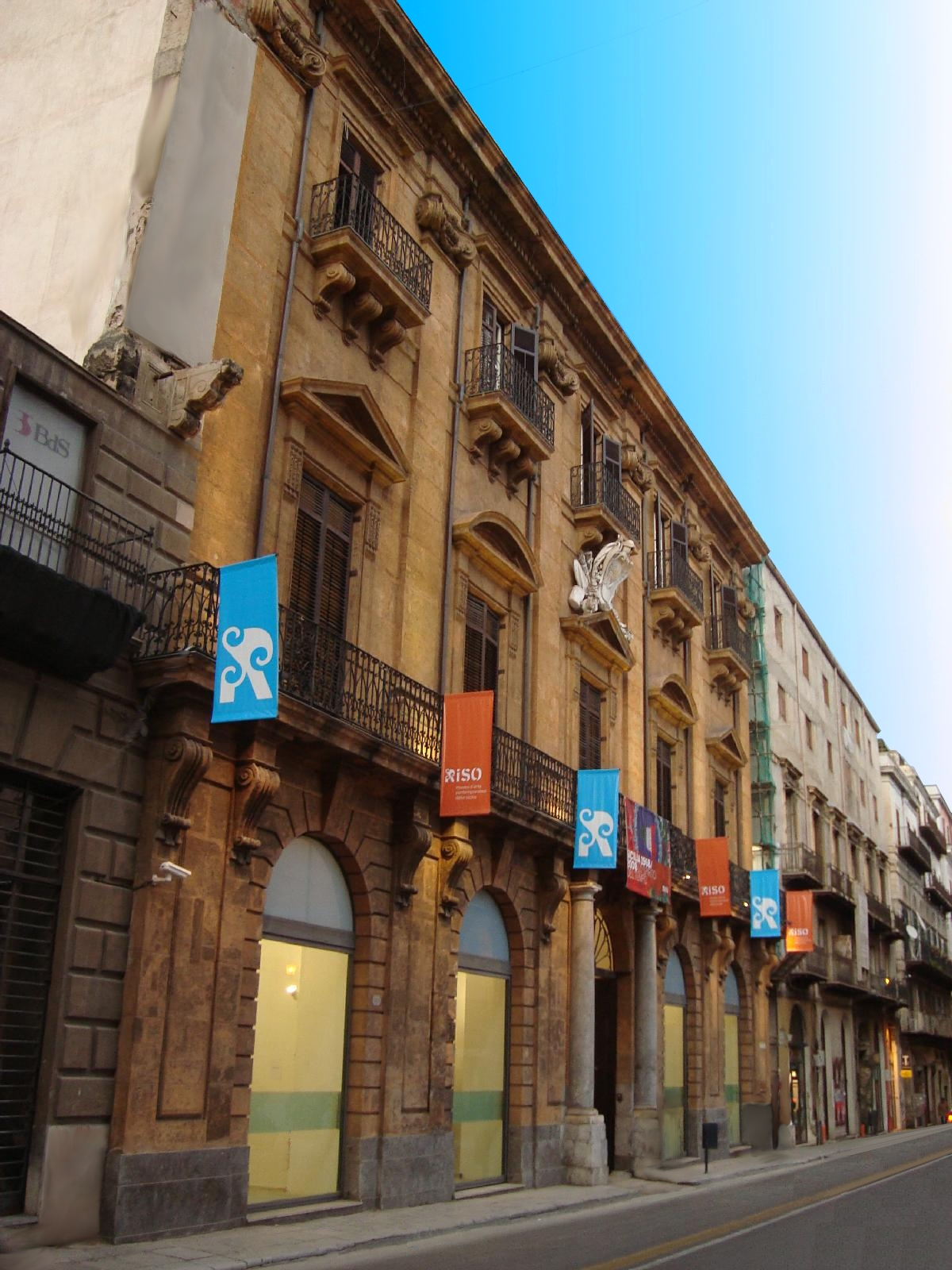
Contemporary Art Museum of Sicily, Palazzo Riso

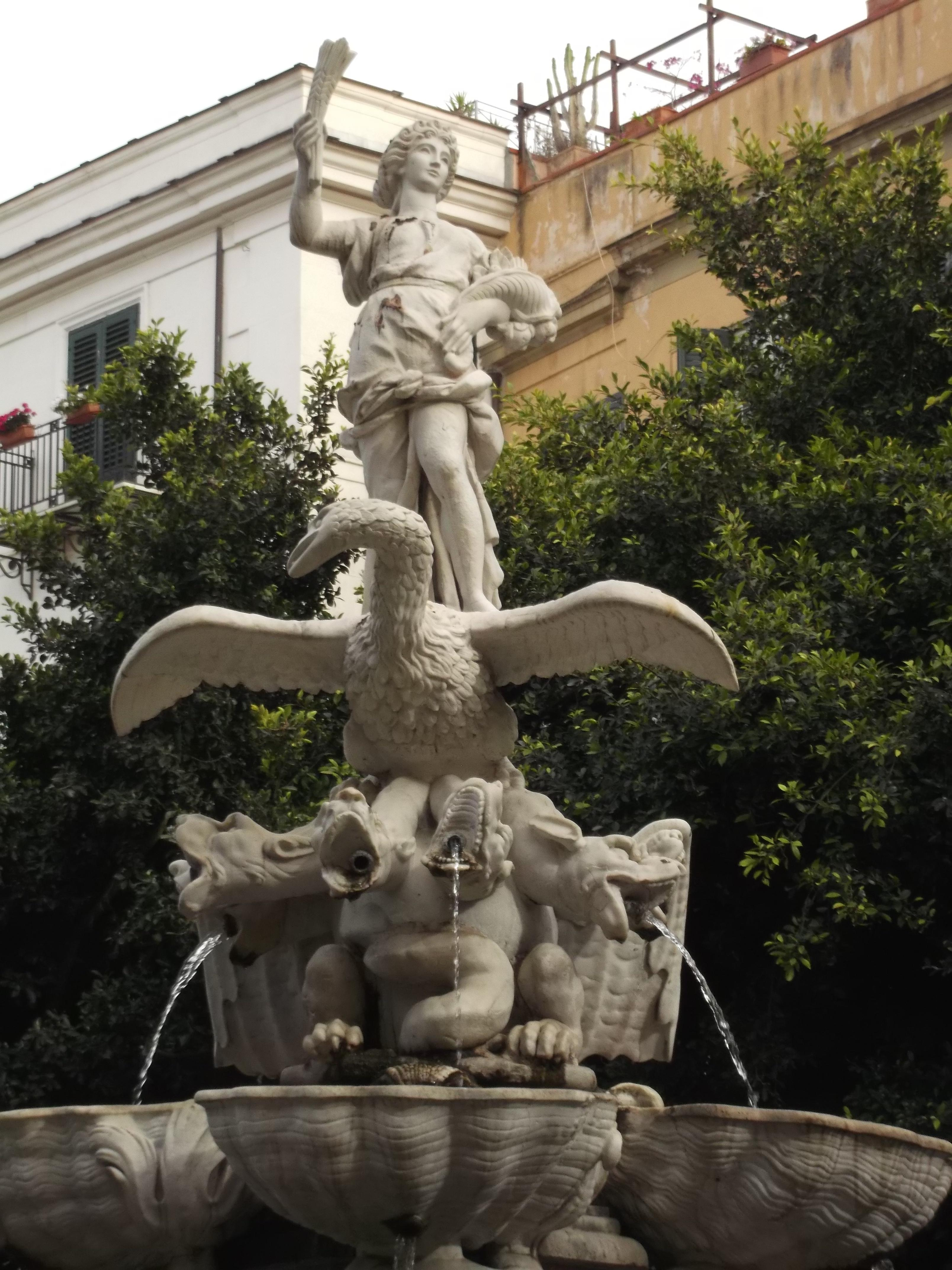
Fontana del Garraffo

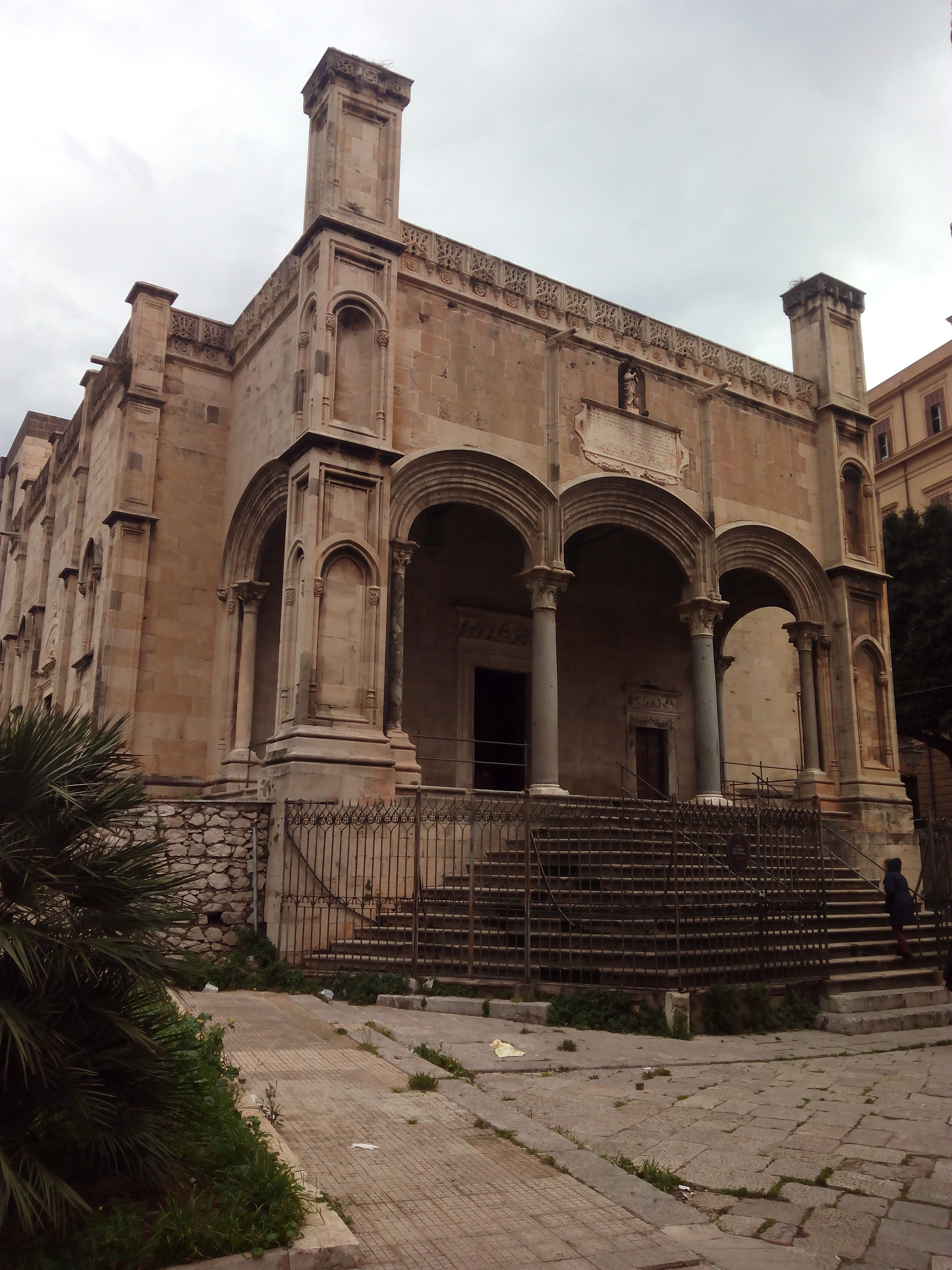
Santa Maria della Catena

Right side	Number	Number	Left side
Piazza Indipendenza
Royal Palace of Palermo (also known as "Palazzo dei Normanni")	Porta Nuova		Military Quarter of San Giacomo
Piazza del Parlamento		475	Military Quarter of San Giacomo
Piazza della Vittoria (Villa Bonanno)		467	Theological Faculty of Sicily
Piazza della Vittoria (Villa Bonanno)		463	Seminary of Palermo
Palazzo del Castillo			Archbishop's Palace
Palazzo Asmundo	492		Palermo Cathedral
Palazzo Imperatore	484		Palermo Cathedral
Palazzo Filangieri di Cutò	474		Palermo Cathedral
Palazzo La Grua di Carini	462		Palermo Cathedral
Palazzo Castrone-Santa Ninfa	452		
			Palazzo Mango di Casalgerardo
		429	Central Library of Sicily
Church of Santissimo Salvatore		417	Palazzo Cesarò Colonna
Palazzo Natoli			
Palazzo Airoldi	382		
Palazzo Algaria			
Piazza Bologni (Monument to Charles V)		365	Palazzo Riso (Contemporary Art Museum of Sicily)
Palazzo Pilo di Marineo	316	327	Palazzo Tarallo della Miraglia
Church of San Giuseppe dei Teatini			
Via Maqueda	Quattro Canti		Via Maqueda
Palazzo Bordonaro			
Palazzo Bonocore			
			Church of San Matteo al Cassaro
Via Roma
		225	Palazzo Tramontana Roccaforte
Palazzo Termine d'Isnello	204		
		187	Palazzo Vannucci di Balchino
Palazzo Ventimiglia di Prades	188		
		157	Palazzo Santa Margherita
		137	Palazzo Roccella
		111	Palazzo Amari di Sant'Adriano
Palazzo Sitano	114		
		93	Palazzo Cammarata Testa
Piazza Marina (Fontana del Garraffo)			Palazzo delle Finanze
Palazzo della Gran Guardia			Church of Santa Maria di Porto Salvo
Church of San Giovanni dei Napoletani		39	Palazzo Vassallo
Piazza Marina			Church of Santa Maria della Catena
Palazzo della Zecca		31	State Archives of Palermo
Piazza Santo Spirito (Fontana del Cavallo Marino)			
Passeggiata delle Cattive			Loggiato San Bartolomeo
	Porta Felice		
Foro Italico

== Feast of Saint Rosalia ==
The Cassaro is the scenery of the long procession of the Chariot of Saint Rosalia during the "Festino", the night between the 14th and 15 July of each year. The feast dedicated to the patron saint of Palermo involves every year tens of thousands of people.

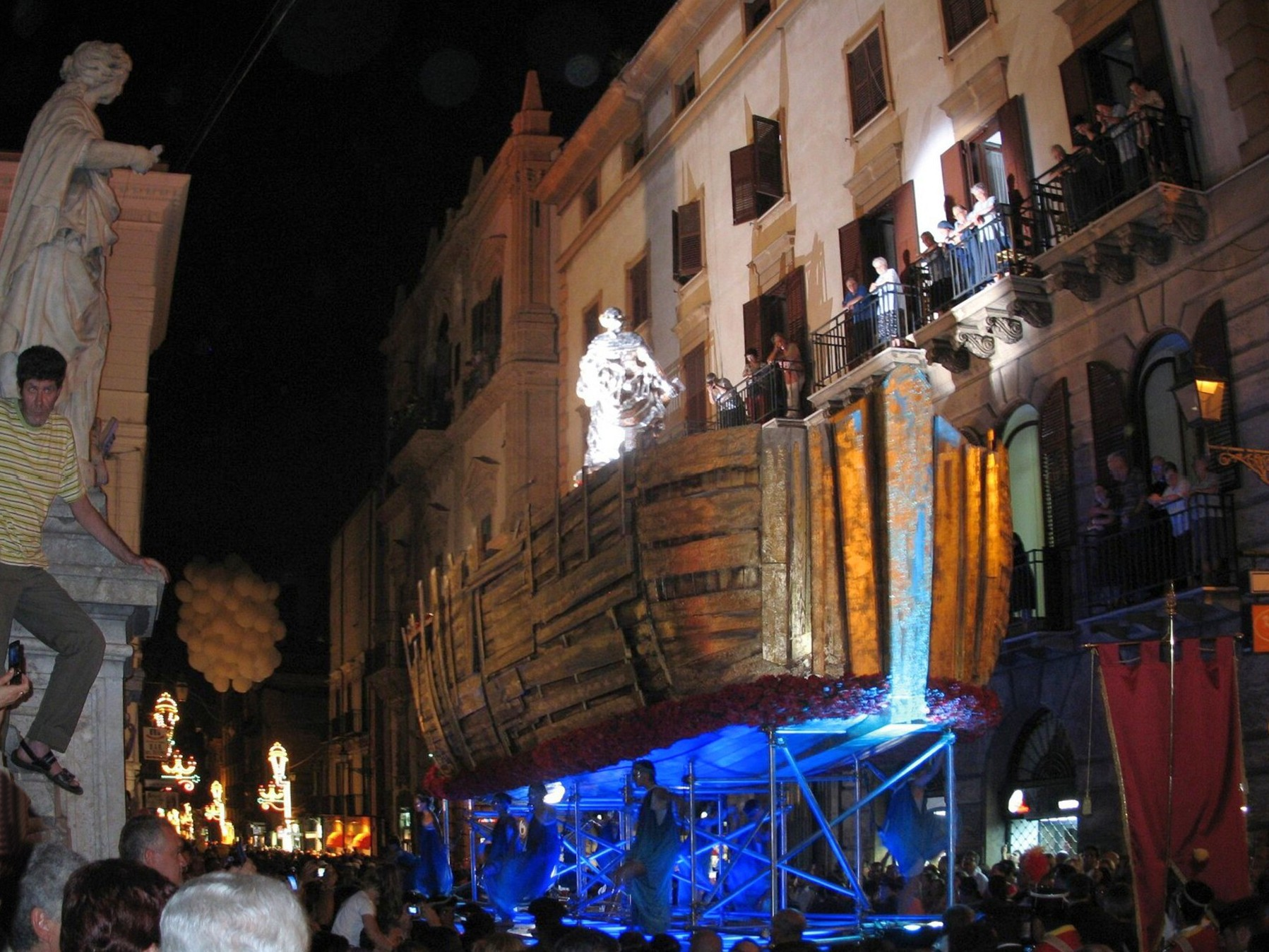
An image from the Festino 2009

== See also ==
- Porta Nuova
- Via Maqueda
- Via Roma
