= Palazzo Cesarò Colonna =

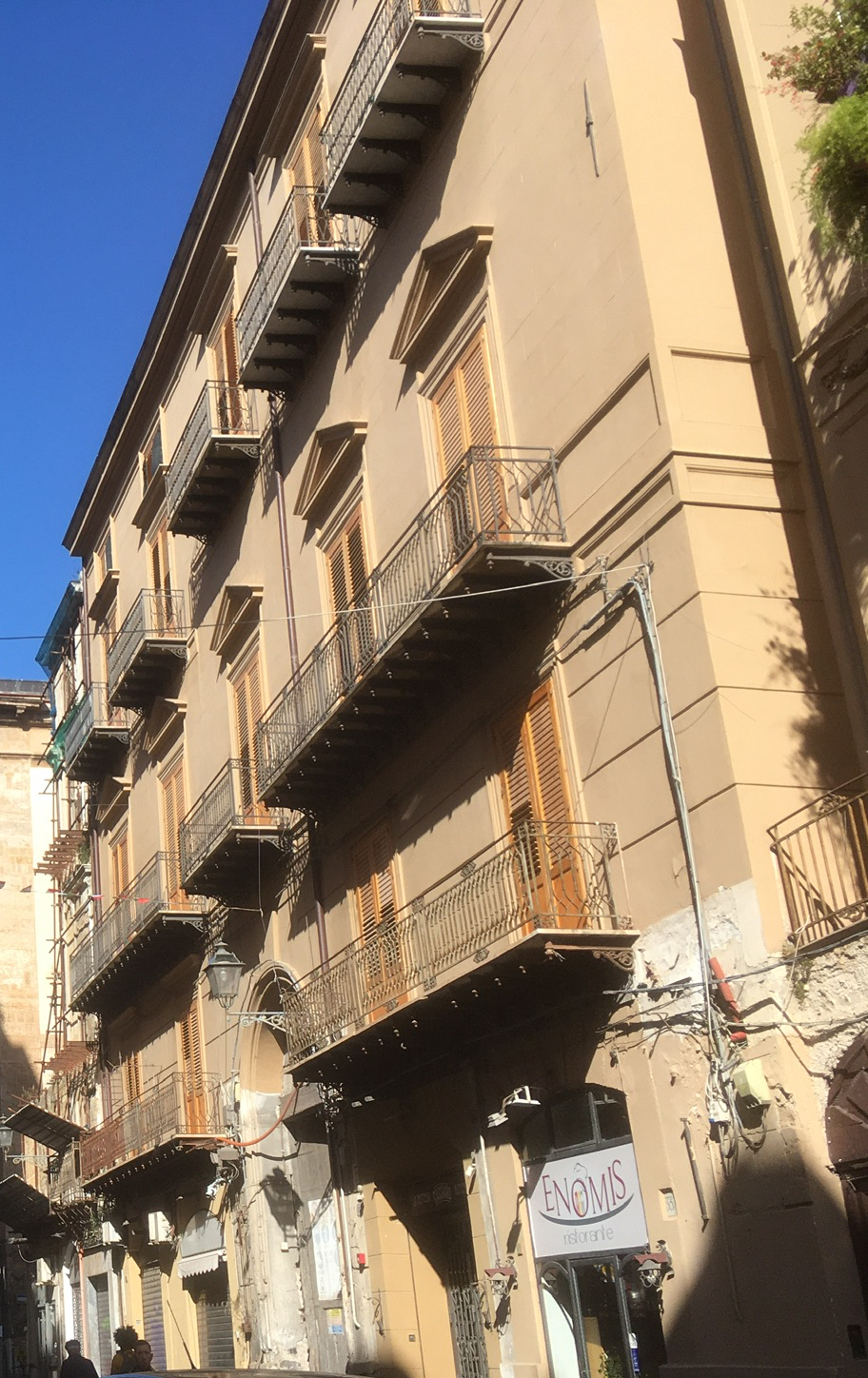
- Façade of the palace. Cassaro, Palermo
- Interactive map of the Palazzo Cesarò Colonna area
- Alternative names: Palazzo Cesarò

General information
- Location: Palermo, Italy, Italy
- Coordinates: 38.11460°N 13.35866°E

The Palazzo Cesarò Colonna, sometimes called Palazzo Cesarò, is a former aristocratic palace located on Via Cassaro 417, now called Via Vittorio Emanuele, facing the church of Santissimo Salvatore in the quarter of Seralcadio, in the historic center of Palermo, region of Sicily, Italy. The palace much altered from its origins, and the portal is dilapidated. It houses business establishments and apartments.

== History ==
The site once was known as the Palazzo Cesarò, and built under the patronage of the Tetano and Giusino family, by the mid-eighteenth century. It was embellished by frescoes by Olivio Sozzi, but it is unclear if these remain. In the second half of the 18th century, Teodato Colonna, the brother of Marcantonio Colonna, Marquess of Stigliano, and viceroy of Sicily. The palace became both a boarding house, and was celebrated for salons, but also as a gambling parlor for the aristocracy. In the 19th century, the Palazzo Cesarò was bought by doctor Stefano Tedeschi Oddo, a physician who earned a medal from Garibaldi for his service at the Battle of Calatafimi.
