= Biblioteca centrale della Regione Siciliana =

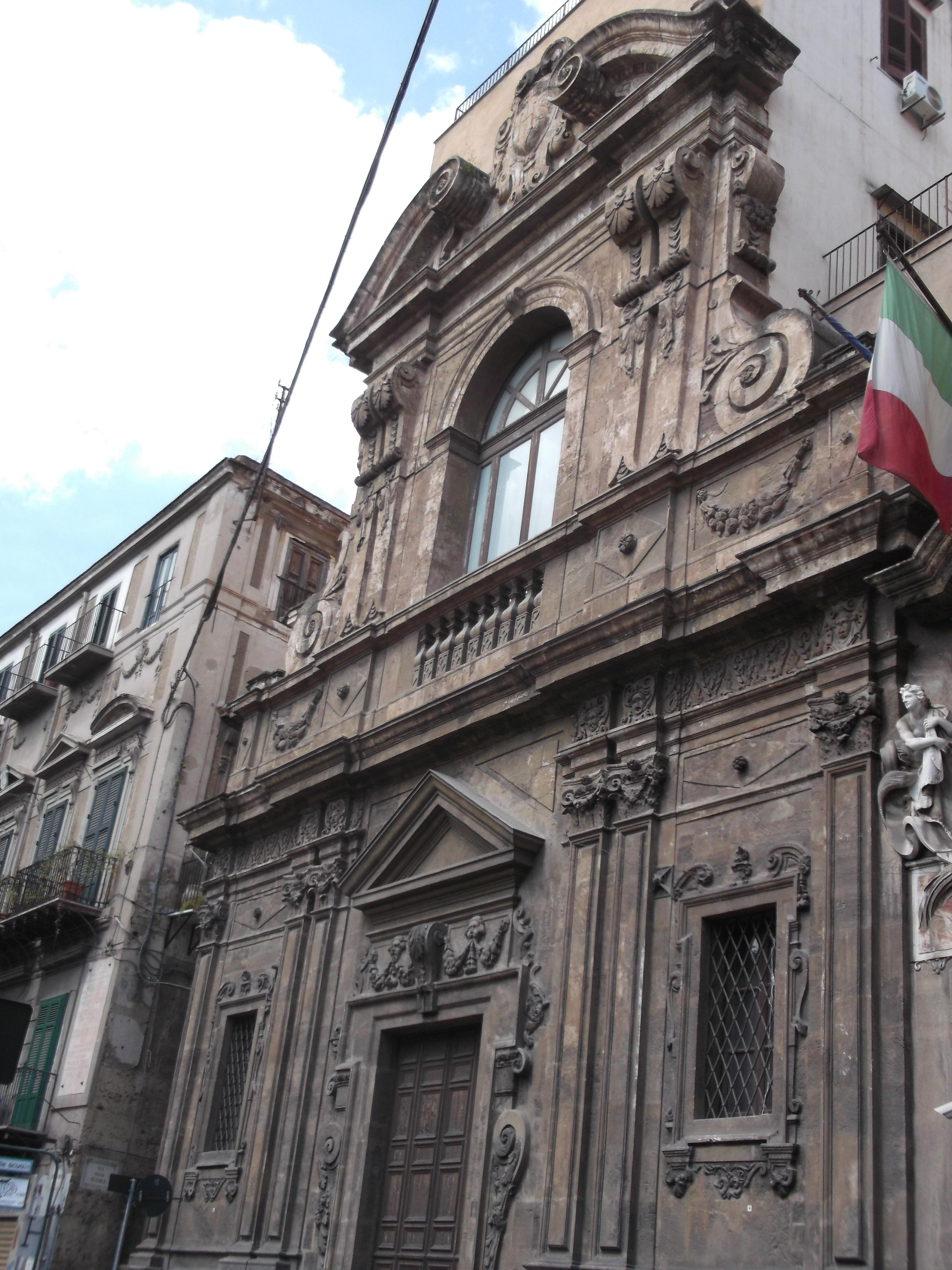
- 38°07′N 13°22′E
- Location: Palermo, Italy

Collection
- Size: 739,921 item (2019), 15,287 item (2019), 753,726 item (2020), 823,290 item (2021), 763,654 item (2022), 15,000 item (2022), 684,791 volume, 1,089 item

Other information
- Website: Official website

The Biblioteca centrale della Regione Siciliana is an historic library located on Via Vittorio Emanuele # 429 in central Palermo, region of Sicily, Italy.

== History ==
A Jesuit school at this site was erected in 1586. Previously the ancient church of Santa Pantaleone was present here, alongside some homes. The Renaissance architecture is sober and functional. The interior has a large courtyard. After the expulsion of the Jesuits in 1767, their library became a royal school in 1782 during the reign Ferdinand I of the Two Sicilies and the instigation of Gabriele Lancillotto Castello, prince of Torremuza. It became a state library in 1860 and remained a national library until being transferred to the Regione Siciliana in 1977. The library now also encompasses the space of the prior adjacent church.

It is housed in the former Jesuit Collegio Massimo of the Jesuits (Collegio Massimo dei Gesuiti) of Palermo and the adjoining baroque former church of Santa Maria della Grotta.

The library houses approximately 1 million volumes and the oldest volumes can be dated to approximately the 10th century. According to Italian law, the library receives all works published within the city of Palermo.

== Major Collections ==
The library houses many major collections and collaborations related to local Sicilian history. To begin with, in 2023 the library collaborated with a local high school, the Vittorio Emanuele II Classical High School, to create a database dedicated to the famous Sicilian writer, Leonardo Sciascia. This collection focuses on articles written by the author during the years 1955–1965. The database also doubles as an educational experience, teaching the students how to create a functional database with indexing and different access points. The students learned how to use metadata in a structured way. Lastly, the library and the students partnered with a Sciascia scholar, Elena Riccio, in order to provide legitimacy to the project.

The library also has a heavy focus on Catholic materials, relevant to the culture of the island. A major collection housed within the library are materials relating to the Immaculate Conception of the Virgin Mary. The collection includes several original tracts and artworks depicting the events of the religious occurrence as well as theological writings by religious orders expounding on the ideas.

Furthermore, the library houses artifacts and devotions to the patron saint of Palermo Saint Rosalia. Artifacts include clothing and photographs as well as local art.

Other major collections of the library include, large amounts of Arabic literature. This is due to the fact that Sicily was once under the cultural and political control of Arab powers. Furthermore, the library also houses editions of the newspaper Giornale di Sicilia going back to the year 1861.

== See also ==
- List of Jesuit sites

== Sources ==
- http://mw.bibliotecacentraleregionesiciliana.it/MW/
- http://anagrafe.iccu.sbn.it/isil/IT-PA0064
