= Porta Nuova (Palermo) =

Monumental city gate of Palermo

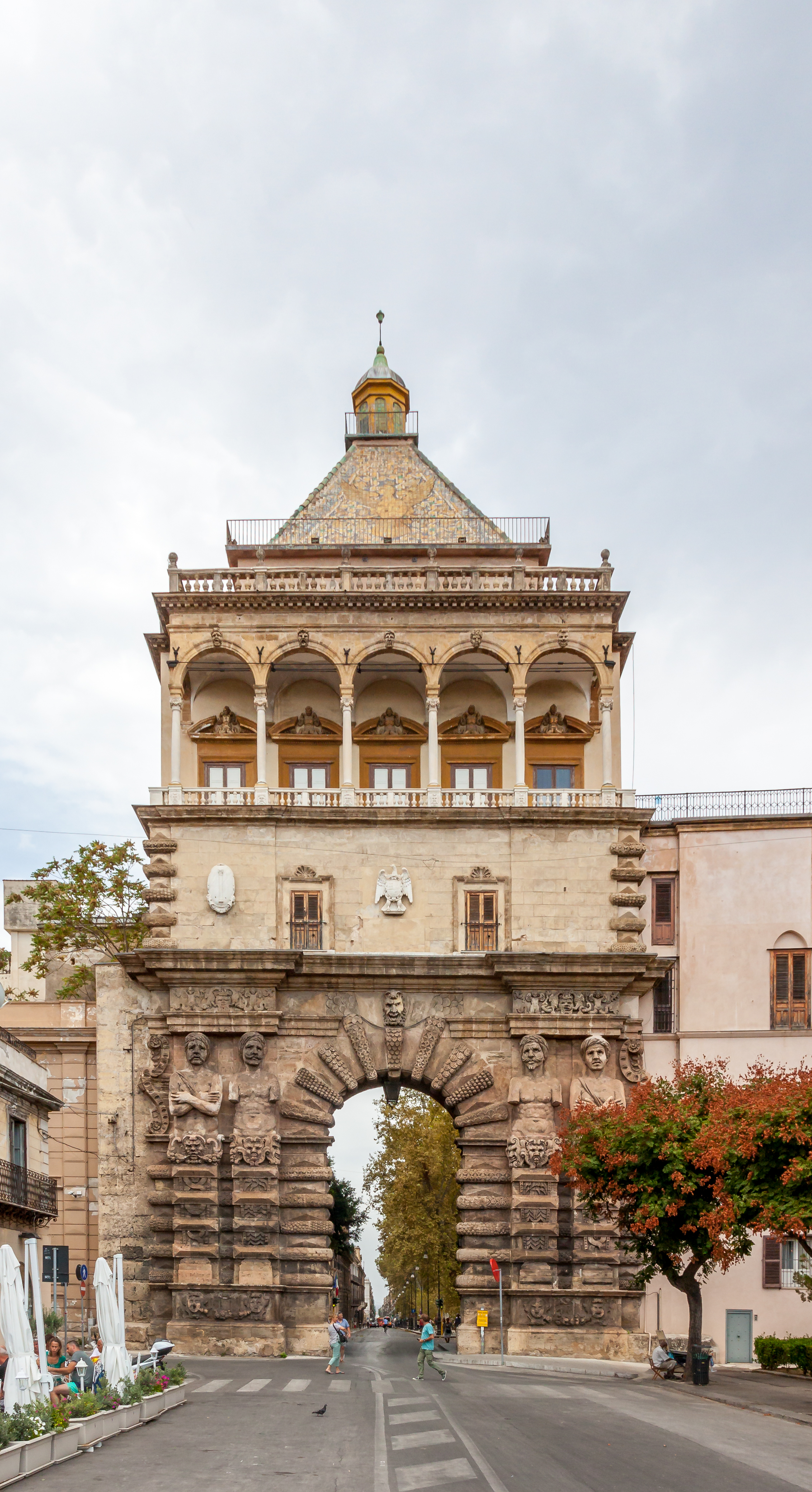
- View from Piazza Indipendenza
- Interactive map of the Porta Nuova area

General information
- Architectural style: Manieristic
- Location: Palermo, Italy
- Coordinates: 38°06′44″N 13°21′10″E
- Construction started: 1583
- Completed: 1669

Design and construction
- Architect: Gaspare Guercio

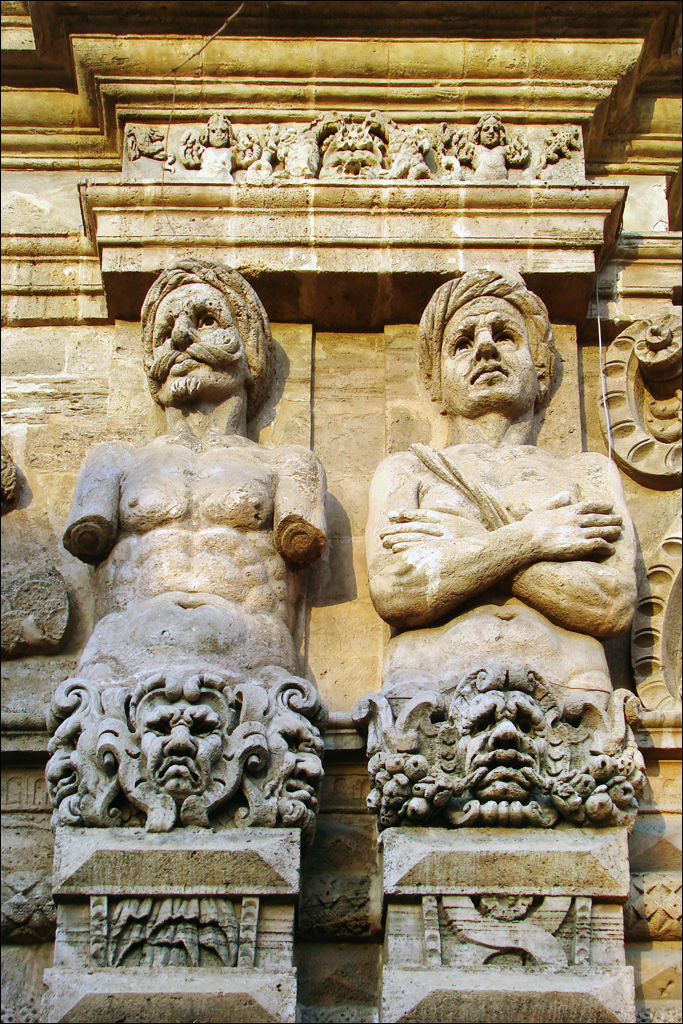
Telamones

Porta Nuova is a monumental city gate of Palermo. It represents the entrance of the Cassaro (the main and most ancient street of the city) from Corso Calatafimi (the way to Monreale) and is located beside Palazzo dei Normanni, royal palace of Palermo. The gate was built to celebrate Charles V's conquest of Tunis (1535) and his visit to the capital of the Kingdom of Sicily.

== History ==
According to the historian Tommaso Fazello the original gate was built in the 15th century. The building was initially called "Porta dell'Aquila" (Gate of the Eagle), but the people of Palermo got used to call it "Porta Nuova" ("New Gate").

After Charles V's conquest of Tunis, the Emperor came to Sicily. He entered in Palermo through this gate on 13 September 1535. In order to commemorate this event, the Senate of Palermo decreed to rebuild the gate in a more sumptuous style. The Viceroy of Sicily Marcantonio Colonna set off the construction in 1583. The gate was completed in 1584. The Viceroy renamed it "Porta Austriaca" (Austrian Gate). For this reason the building was also called "Porta Imperiale" (Imperial Gate). But nevertheless, the name "Porta Nuova" continues to be used.

The gate was destroyed in 1667 when a fire erupted inside the warehouse of the building. The Senate of Palermo commissioned the architect Gaspare Guercio to rebuild the gate. The work was completed in 1669.

== Description ==
The facade leading to the Cassaro has the typical style of the triumphal arches. The facade leading to the Corso Calatifimi and Piazza Indipendenza presents four big telamones depicting the Moors defeated by Charles V.

== See also ==
- Cassaro
- Corso Calatafimi
- Piazza Indipendenza
- Porta Felice
