= Gabriele Lancillotto Castello =

Italian numismatist and antiquarian

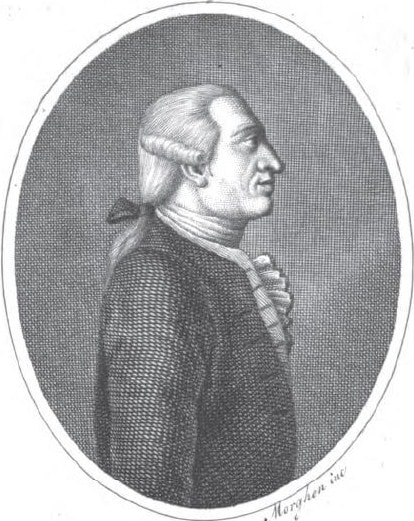

Gabriele Lancillotto Castello, prince of Torremuzza and marques of Motta d'Affermo (1727–1794) was an Italian nobleman, antiquarian and numismatist, most notable for his study of Sicily's coins and ancient past. He was also known as Lancellotto Castelli and wrote under the pseudonym Selinunte Drogonteo.

== Life ==
Born in Palermo, in 1734 he entered the Collegio Borbonico, run by Palermo's Theatines. He was taught modern and ancient literature by abbot Jacoponi from Tuscany and in the college his favourite subject was Sicily's ancient, medieval and recent history. He and other scholars from the city planned a "Storia generale dell'Isola".

In 1762 Torremuzza published "Le antiche iscrizioni di Palermo", describing ancient inscriptions which the city's senate had rediscovered in 1586 and which in 1716 were housed in the town hall. In 1753 he published the arcadian pastoral "Storia di Alesa" under the pseudonym "Selinunte Drogonteo", though his most famous works are "Siciliae veteres nummi" and Siciliae veterum inscriptionum nova collectio".

In 1783 he became an associate of the Académie des inscriptions et belles-lettres. He gave around 12,000 volumes to the Jesuits, which became the nucleus of what is now the Biblioteca centrale della Regione Siciliana. He died in Palermo and is buried at the church of San Domenico.

== Main works ==
- Siciliae populorum, urbium, regum et tyrannorum numismata, Panormi, 1767;
- Siciliae et objacentium insularum veterum inscriptionum nova collectio, Panormi, 1769;
- Siciliae veteres nummi, Panormi, 1781.

== Bibliography ==
- (in French) Dictionnaire universel d'histoire et de géographie, 26ª edition, Paris, 1878, (Wikisource)
- (in Italian) Francesco Ferrara, Storia generale della Sicilia: Storia civile vol. 6, Palermo 1833 p. 403
- (in Italian) Maria Amalia Mastelloni, Gabriele Lancillotto Castelli e Giglio principe di Torremuzza e gli studi numismatici, in I Borbone in Sicilia (1734 1860), a cura di E. IACHELLO, Catania 1998, pp. 170-176
- http://www.treccani.it/enciclopedia/gabriele-lancellotto-castelli-principe-di-torremuzza
- http://www.treccani.it/enciclopedia/castelli-gabriele-lancellotto-principe-di-torremuzza_(Dizionario_Biografico)/
