= Palazzo Asmundo, Palermo =

Coordinates: 38°06′48″N 13°21′22″E

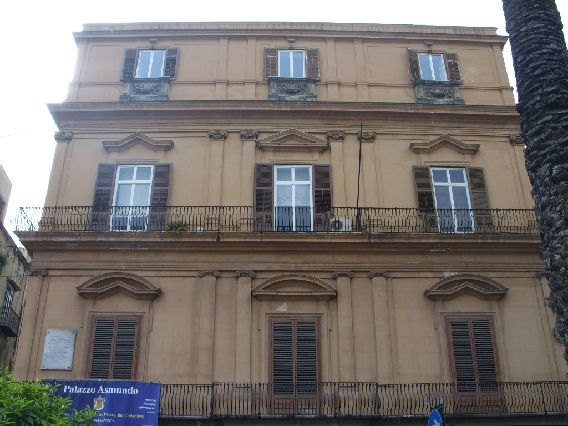
Facade of palace

The Palazzo Asmundo is a late-Baroque aristocratic residence located on via Vittorio Emanuele, corner Via Pietro Novelli #3, in central Palermo, region of Sicily, Italy. The palace front faces the piazza and garden on the south flank of the Cathedral of Palermo. The privately owned palace is presently a museum and exhibition space.

== History ==
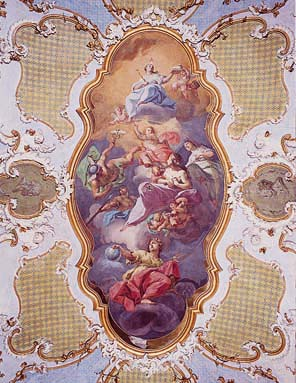
Ceiling fresco painted by Martorana

The palace was originally built in 1615 for a Doctor Baliana. Construction continued for over a century, and was not completed until 1767 when it was owned by Giuseppe Asmundo, the then Presidente di Giustizia and Marquess of Sessa. Prior to coming into possession by the Asmundo family, it was owned by the Joppolo family of the Princes of Sant'Elia. A plaque on the palace claims that the Daughter of king Ferdinand I of the Two Sicilies was housed in this palace starting in 1806, when they were exiled from Naples by the Napoleonic army

The interior stuccoes were made by followers of Giacomo Serpotta, and much of the interior frescoes were painted by Gioacchino Martorana. The entrance appears to be from Via Pietro Novelli, since the main facade is cluttered with souvenir shops.

The interior of the palace retains some of the original stucco and fresco decoration, and houses an eclectic collection of items amassed by the Martorana family, the present owners. These include Sicilian ceramics and a porcelain collection; maps and postcards, and a coin collection.
