= Piazza della Vittoria, Palermo =

Piazza della Vittoria
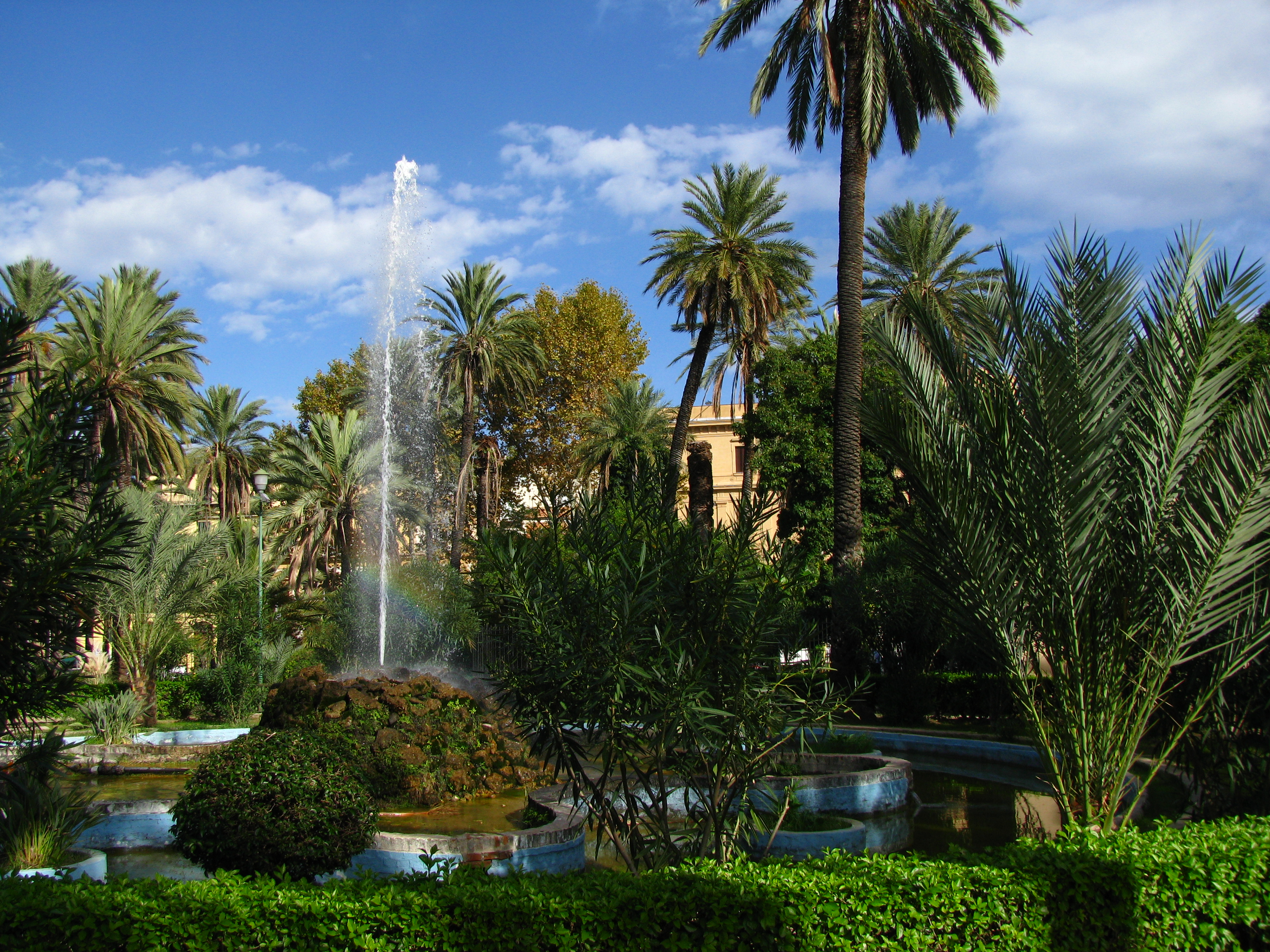
- Piazza della Vittoria, Villa Bonanno
- Location: Palermo, Sicily, Italy
- Coordinates: 38°06′45″N 13°21′19″E

Victory Square (Italian: Piazza della Vittoria) is a square of Palermo. It is located between the Royal Palace and the Palermo Cathedral, down the Cassaro street, in the quarter of the Albergaria, within the historic centre of Palermo. The square is dominated by the great garden of Villa Bonanno.

== History ==
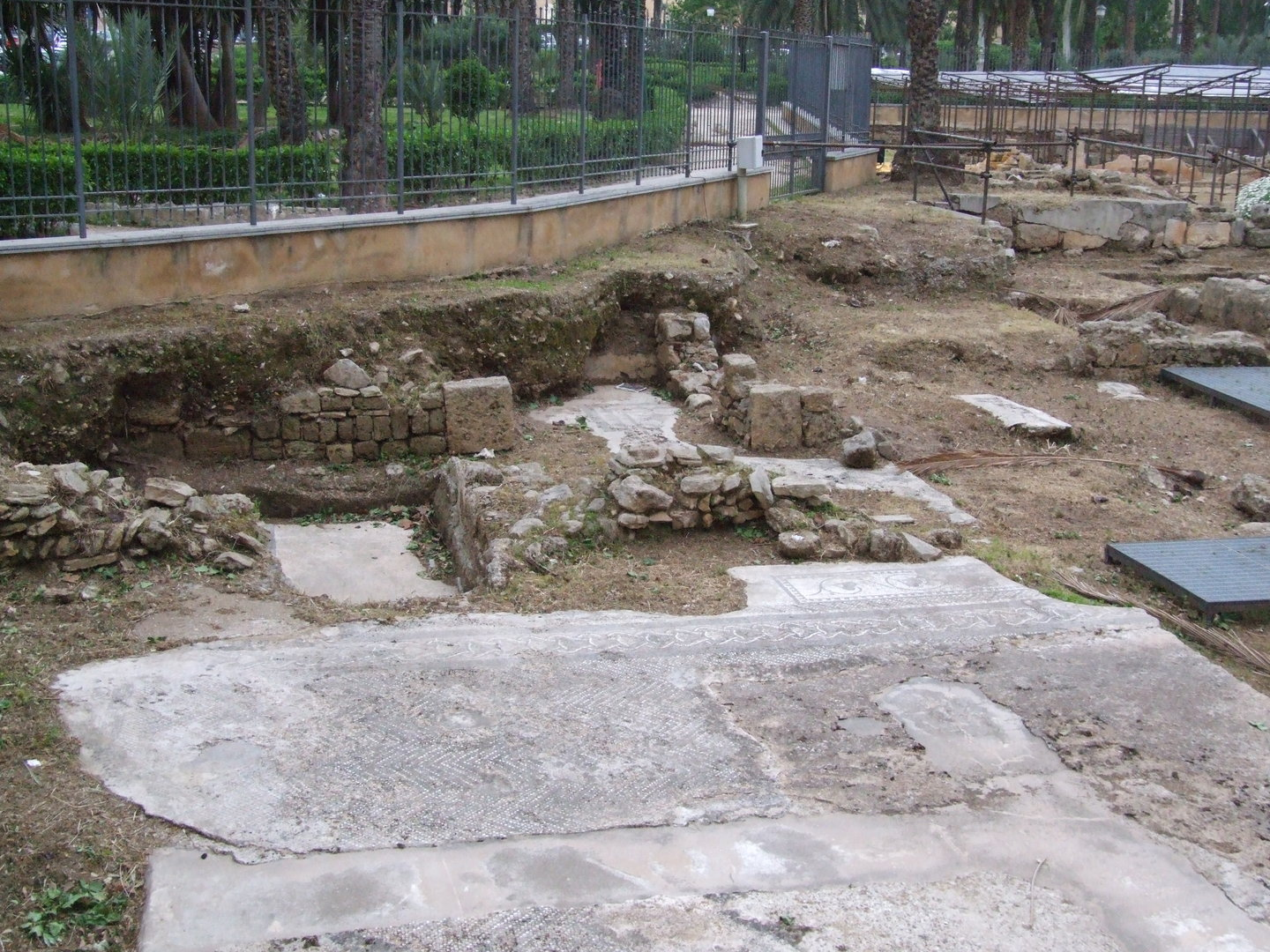
Roman ruins and mosaics

Piazza della Vittoria is situated in the most ancient zone of Palermo. In this area, in fact, the city was founded by the Phoenicians in the 8th century BC. During the Roman era, the area was called "Paleopolis" in order to distinguish it from the more recent "Neapolis". After the Islamic conquest of Sicily Palermo became the island's capital and the Paleopolis was fortified and called in Arabic "al-Halqah" (fence, corral). This Arabic word then became the Sicilian "Galca".

In the 16th century the area was subject to large changes. Many buildings were demolished and a flat space, called "Piano del Palazzo Reale", was created. The new square became the scene of the main public parades of Palermo.

In the late 19th century a number of archaeological digs discovered some ruins and mosaics belonging to three Roman patrician houses. Some of these archaeological finds are now housed in the Regional Archeological Museum Antonio Salinas.

In 1905 the square was occupied by the new Villa Bonanno, a great garden designed by Giuseppe Damiani Almeyda and named after the mayor Pietro Bonanno. The square is called "della Vittoria" in honor of the 1820 uprising against the Bourbonist garrison.

== See also ==
- Villa Bonanno
- Piazza del Parlamento
- Palazzo dei Normanni
