= Santissimo Salvatore, Palermo =

Roman Catholic church in Palermo, Italy

Church of Most Holy Saviour
- Chiesa del Santissimo Salvatore (in Italian)
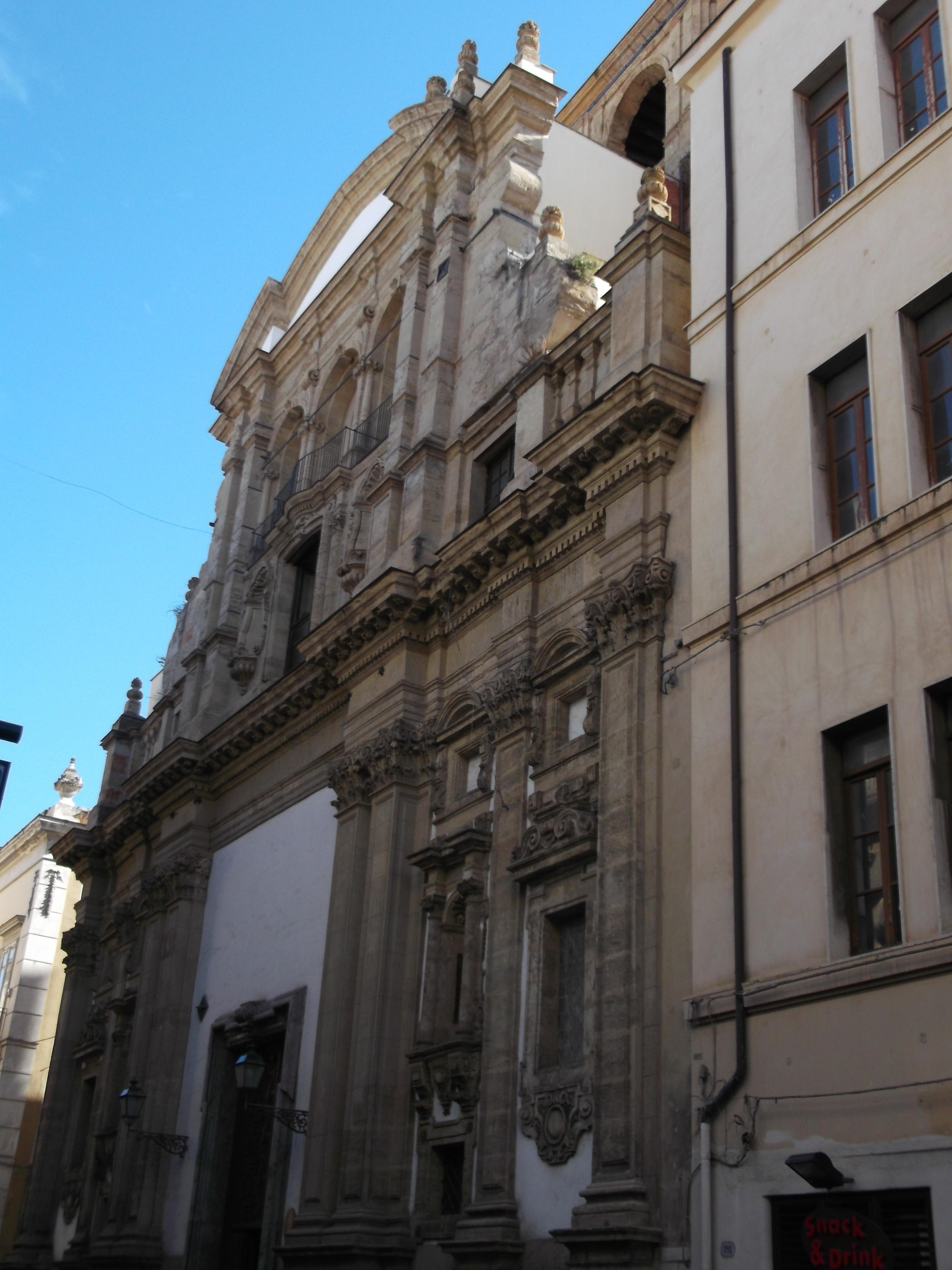
- Facade of the church

Religion
- Affiliation: Roman Catholic
- Province: Archdiocese of Palermo
- Rite: Roman Rite
- Year consecrated: 1704

Location
- Location: Palermo, Italy
- Interactive map of Church of Most Holy Saviour
- Coordinates: 38°06′51.54″N 13°21′31.51″E

Architecture
- Architect: Paolo Amato
- Style: Sicilian Baroque
- Groundbreaking: 1682

The Church of Most Holy Saviour (Italian: Chiesa del Santissimo Salvatore) is a Baroque-style, Roman Catholic church in Palermo, Italy. It is located at #396 of the ancient main street of Palermo, the Cassaro, presently Via Vittorio Emanuele, in the ancient Albergaria quarter.

== History ==
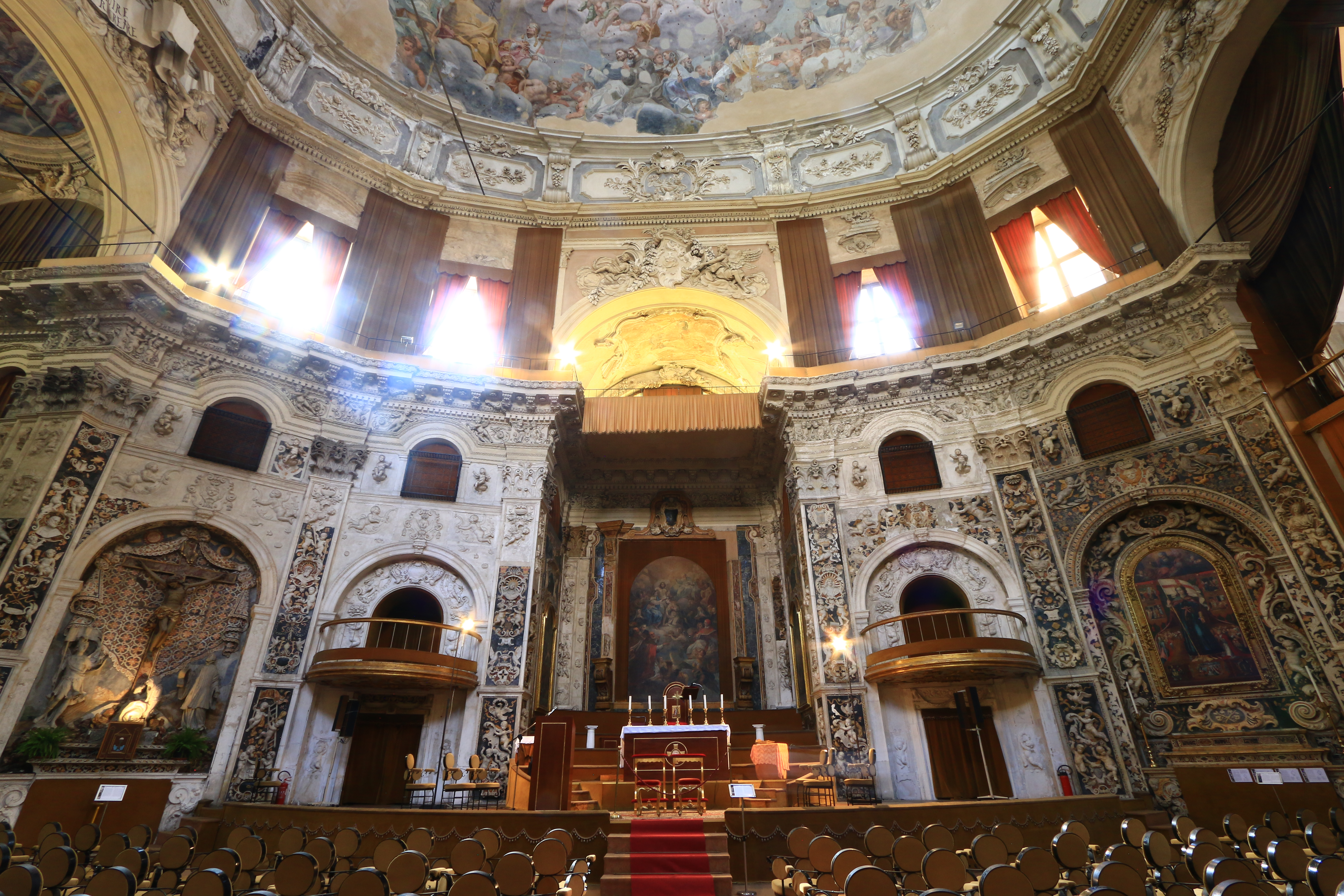
Interior of church

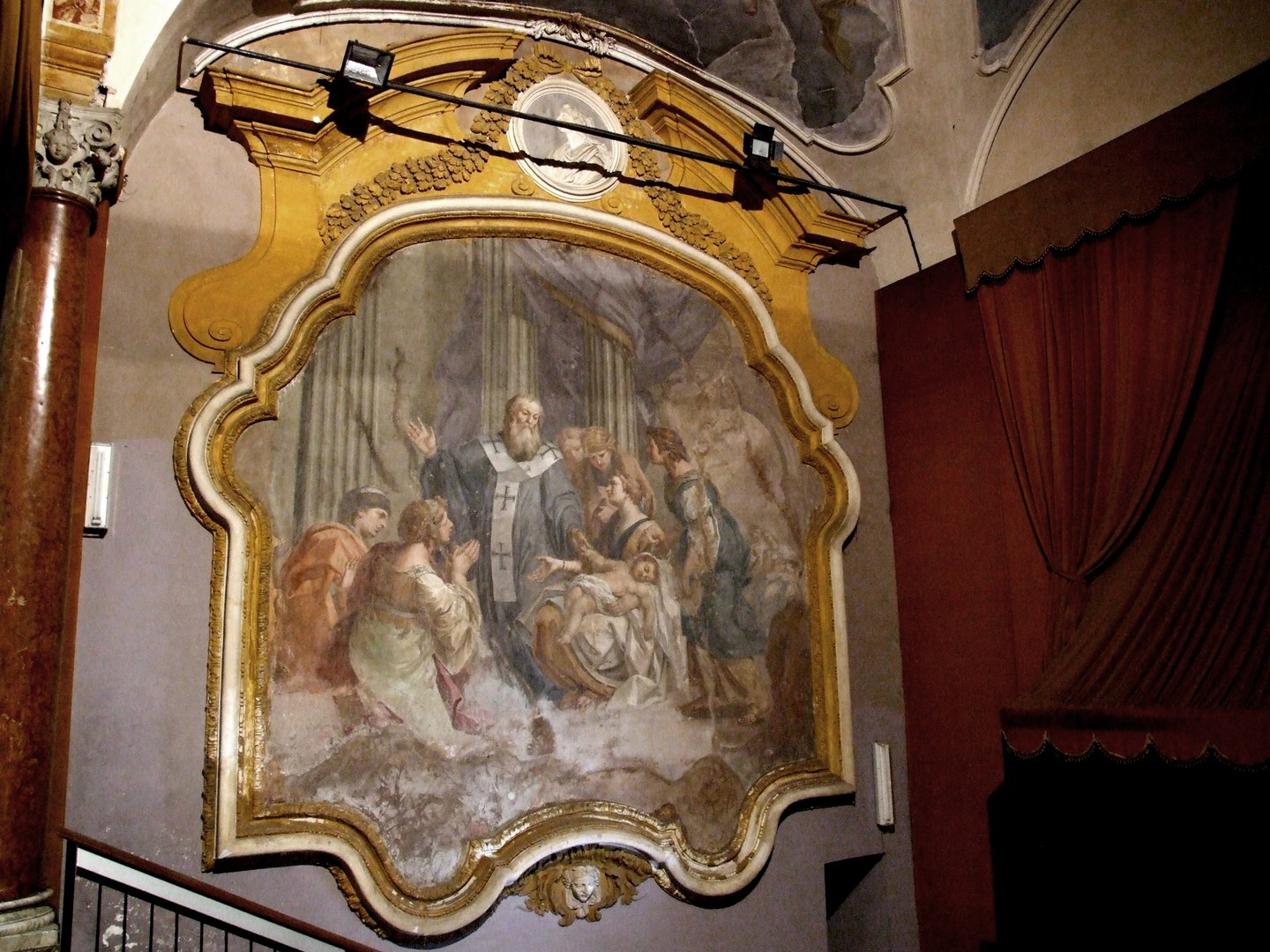
Miracle of Healing of the Child by St Basil, fresco by Vito D'Anna

The site of the present church was formerly the location of a Basilian (Eastern Rite) monastery and church dedicated to the Saviour, founded in 1072 by the Norman Robert Guiscard. Royal patronage of the church and monastery continued under Hohenstaufen rule. It was said that Constance, Queen of Sicily (1154-1198) was confined to the church as a nun from her childhood until the age of 30, due to the prediction that "her marriage would destroy Sicily". In 1501, the monastery was converted to the Latin Rite.

In 1528, a new church was built on the site with three naves; it was positioned in an opposite orientation to the former building. In 1682, the present layout was designed by Paolo Amato, who was assisted by the Jesuit Angelo Italia. Construction proceeded until a formal inauguration in 1700 and consecration in 1704. Much of the interior decoration was added during the 18th century. An earthquake in 1726 caused much damage to the church, including the loss of the main altar designed by Giacomo Amato and Gaetano Lazzara. This led to a further reinforcement of the large dome in 1763 under the direction of Vincenzo Giovenco. The cupola interior was frescoed by Vito D'Anna, who painted a Glory of St Basil (now fragmentary). Further decoration included the pavements of the Chapels of St Basil (left) and Santa Rosalia (right). The pavement of the main floor was designed in 1856 by Giuseppe Patricolo.

In 1943, during World War II, the interior of the church was damaged by Allied bombardment of the city. Many of the paintings in the church were destroyed. The present building is only the result of a major restoration, utilizing when possible the remnants of the former decoration. The building plan is an elongated dodecagon, circumscribed by an ellipse whose major axis is from the middle of the entrance. The walls of the church are richly decorated with precious Sicilian polychrome marbles by the master Salvatore Allegra, and above, the dome ceiling is decorated with stuccoes by the master Francesco Alaimo.

Inside there are three chapels. The largest one is dominated by a small dome frescoed by Filippo Tancredi. The frescoes on the walls of the entrance staircase depict the Miracle of the Healing of the Child by St Basil and St Basil preaching, painted by Vito D'Anna. In the apse is a large marble group representing the Crucified Christ between the Archangel Michael, Saint Cajetan, and Saint Mary Magdalene. Overlooking the present presbytery is a 1725 painting by Cedri depicting the Coronation of Santa Rosalia; it was formerly housed in the nearby Benedictine Monastery of Santa Rosalia, which was razed in the 20th century to expand the Via Roma.

== See also ==
- 17th-century Western domes
