= Porta Felice =

City gate of Palermo, Sicily

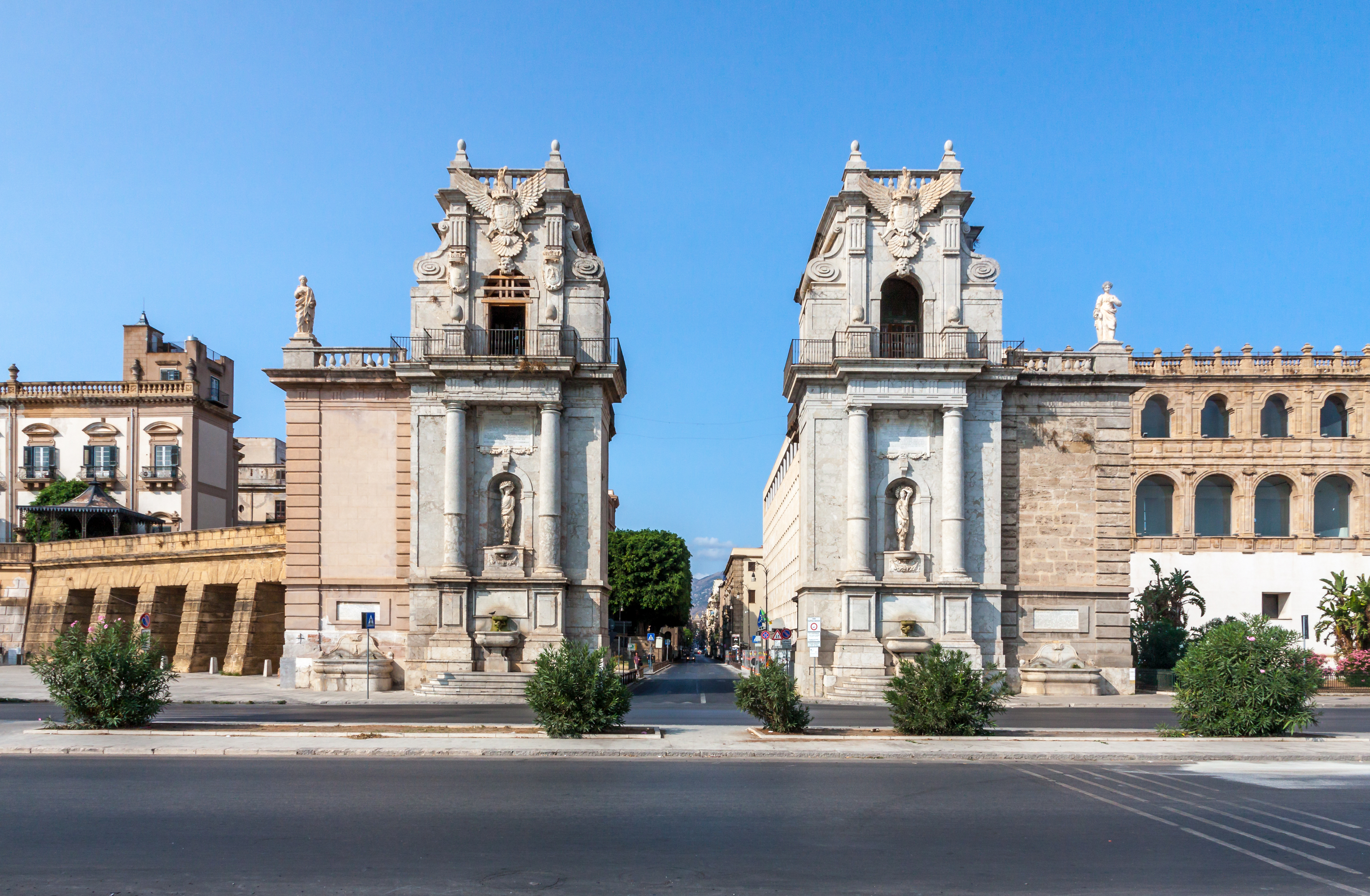
- View from sea down Via Vittorio Emanuele, to the left is the northern entrance to the Passeggiata delle Cattive and behind the Palazzo Butera, and to the right the Loggiato di San Bartolomeo
- Interactive map of the Porta Felice area

General information
- Architectural style: Renaissance, Baroque
- Location: Palermo, Italy
- Coordinates: 38°07′11″N 13°22′16.60″E
- Construction started: 1582
- Completed: 1637

Design and construction
- Architect: Mariano Smiriglio

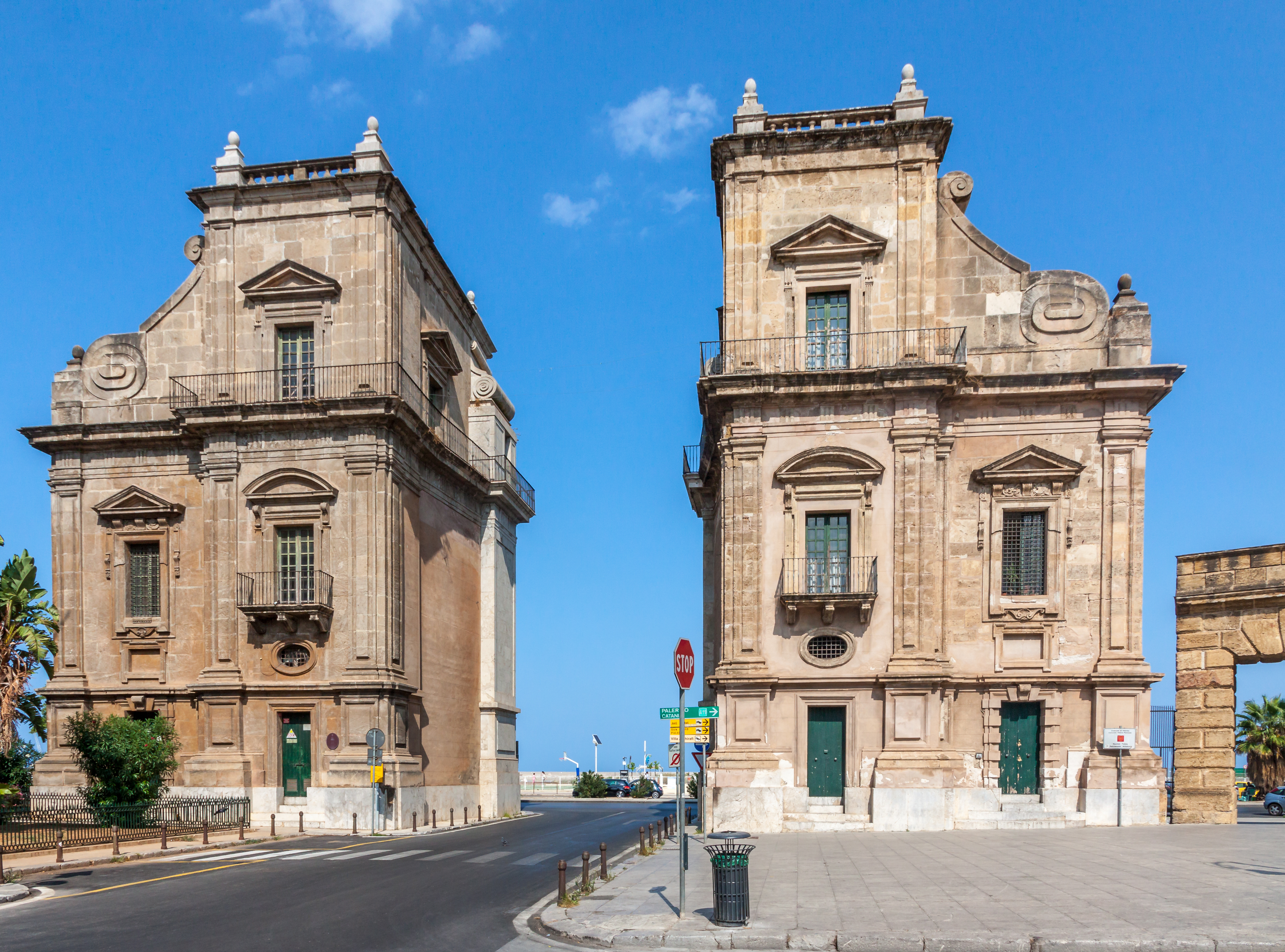
View from the Cassaro

Porta Felice is a monumental city gate of Palermo, Sicily; the gate is located in the zone of the Foro Italico and the Castellammare quarter. It represents the water-side entrance into Via Vittorio Emanuele (formerly the Cassaro), the most ancient main street of the city. The gate was built in Renaissance and Baroque styles between the 16th and 17th centuries.

== History ==
In 1581 the street of the Cassaro was extended in the vicinity of the sea. The Viceroy of Sicily Marcantonio Colonna decided to build a monumental gate in the new water-side entrance of the Cassaro (the same thing was done on the opposite side with Porta Nuova). The gate was named after the wife of Colonna, Felice Orsini. On 6 July 1582 the groundbreaking ceremony took place.

In the following years the construction was stopped. In 1602 the new Viceroy Lorenzo Suárez de Figueroa y Córdoba, Duke of Feria, decided to resume the work. The project was assigned to the senatorial architect Mariano Smiriglio. When he died, in 1636, the work was assigned to Pietro Novelli. In 1637 the gate was completed. In 1642 two fountains were added.

During the Second World War the right pillar was almost entirely destroyed by aerial bombing. Later, a restoration has partially succeeded in restoring Porta Felice to its former glory.

== Art ==
Flanking the pillars on the second floor, facing seaward, are statues representing two female saints: Santa Ninfa and Santa Cristina. At the top of the pillar are eagles with the coat of arms of the viceroy Colonna. The eagle as well is a symbol of Palermo and the Hapsburg monarchs.

== See also ==
- Passeggiata delle Cattive
