= Filippo Tancredi =

Italian painter

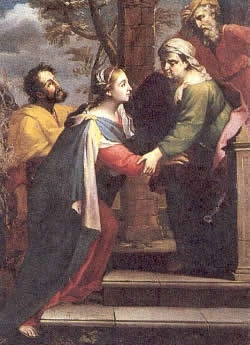
La Visitazione (The Visitation) by Filippo Tancredi, Museo Regionale, Messina, 1533

Filippo Tancredi (1655–1722) was an Italian painter.

== Biography ==
He was born in Messina. His father was a minor painter and his mother was a sister of the painter Filippo Giannetto. 1823 He trained in Naples, and afterwards visited Rome, where he entered the school of Carlo Maratta. He spent a great part of his life in Palermo, where he painted the ceiling of the church of the San Giuseppe dei Teatini, and that of the Gesù Nuovo. He died in Palermo.
