= San Giuseppe dei Teatini, Palermo =

Roman Catholic church in Palermo, Italy

Church of Saint Joseph of the Theatines
- Chiesa di San Giuseppe dei Teatini (in Italian)
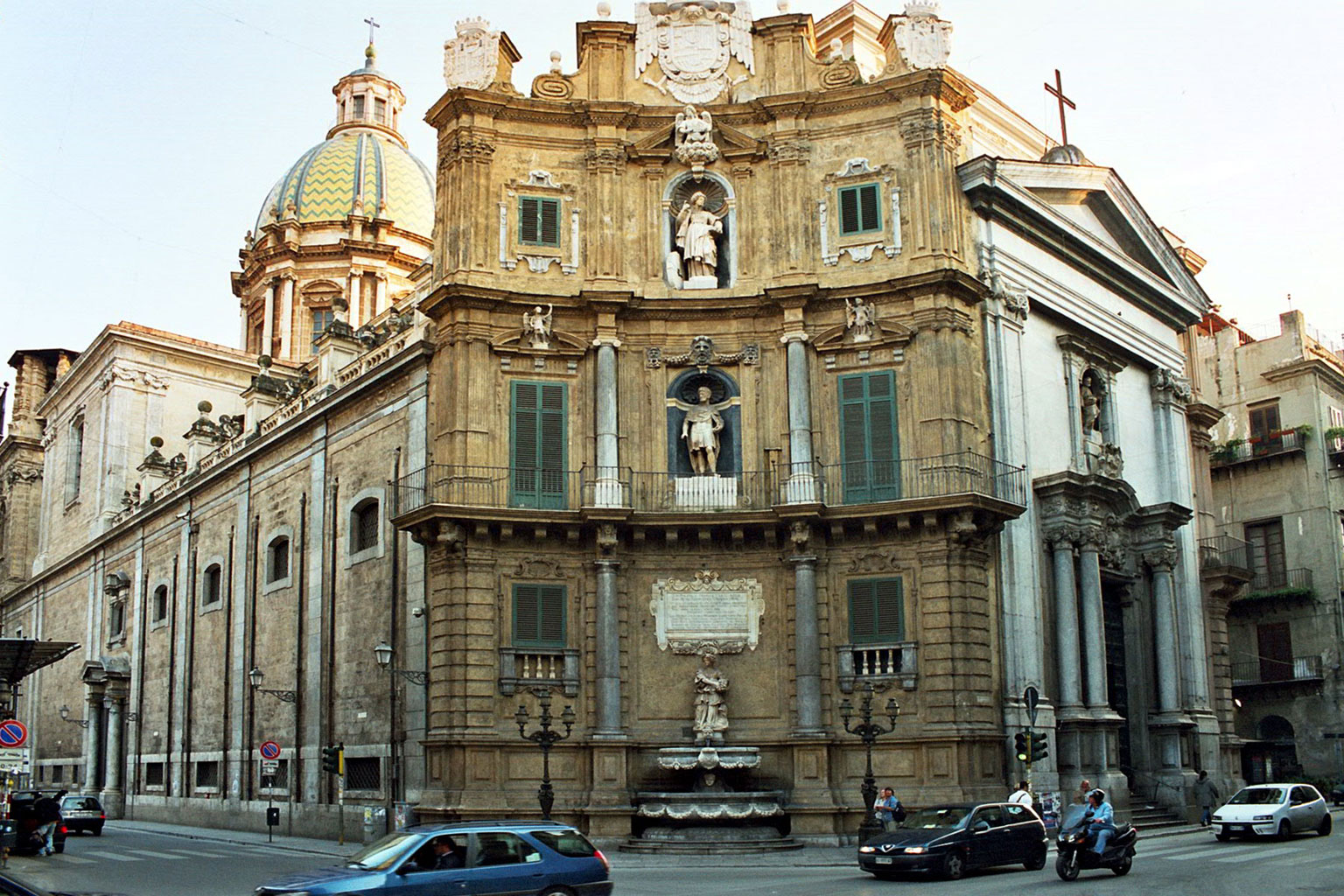
- Façade from the Quattro Canti

Religion
- Affiliation: Roman Catholic
- Province: Archdiocese of Palermo
- Rite: Roman Rite

Location
- Location: Palermo, Italy
- Interactive map of Church of Saint Joseph of the Theatines
- Coordinates: 38°06′54.76″N 13°21′41.55″E

Architecture
- Style: Sicilian Baroque
- Groundbreaking: 1612
- Completed: 1677

San Giuseppe dei Teatini is a Roman Catholic church on Via Vittorio Emanuele, at the southwest corner of the Quattro Canti, in the historic center of the city of Palermo, region of Sicily, Italy. The east flank of the nave faces the Fontana Pretoria, across the piazza from Santa Caterina. San Giuseppe is an example of the Sicilian Baroque in Palermo.

== History ==
The church was built at the beginning of the 17th century by Giacomo Besio, a Genoese member of the Theatine order. It has a majestic though simple façade. In the centre niche is housed a statue of San Gaetano, founder of the order. Another striking feature is the large dome with a blue and yellow majolica covering. The tambour decorated with double columns, and was designed by Giuseppe Mariani. The belfry tower was designed by Paolo Amato.

The interior has a Latin cross plan with a nave and two aisles, divided by marble columns of variable height. The inner decoration is a nearly overwhelming parade of Baroque art, with stuccoes by Paolo Corso and Giuseppe Serpotta. Frescoes decorate the nave ceiling and the transept vault, painted by Filippo Tancredi, Guglielmo Borremans and Giuseppe Velasquez. The frescoes were severely damaged during World War II, but have been accurately restored. The most important piece of art is however a wood crucifix by Fra' Umile of Petralia.

The crypt houses remains of a former church, dedicated to Madonna of Providence.

== Gallery ==
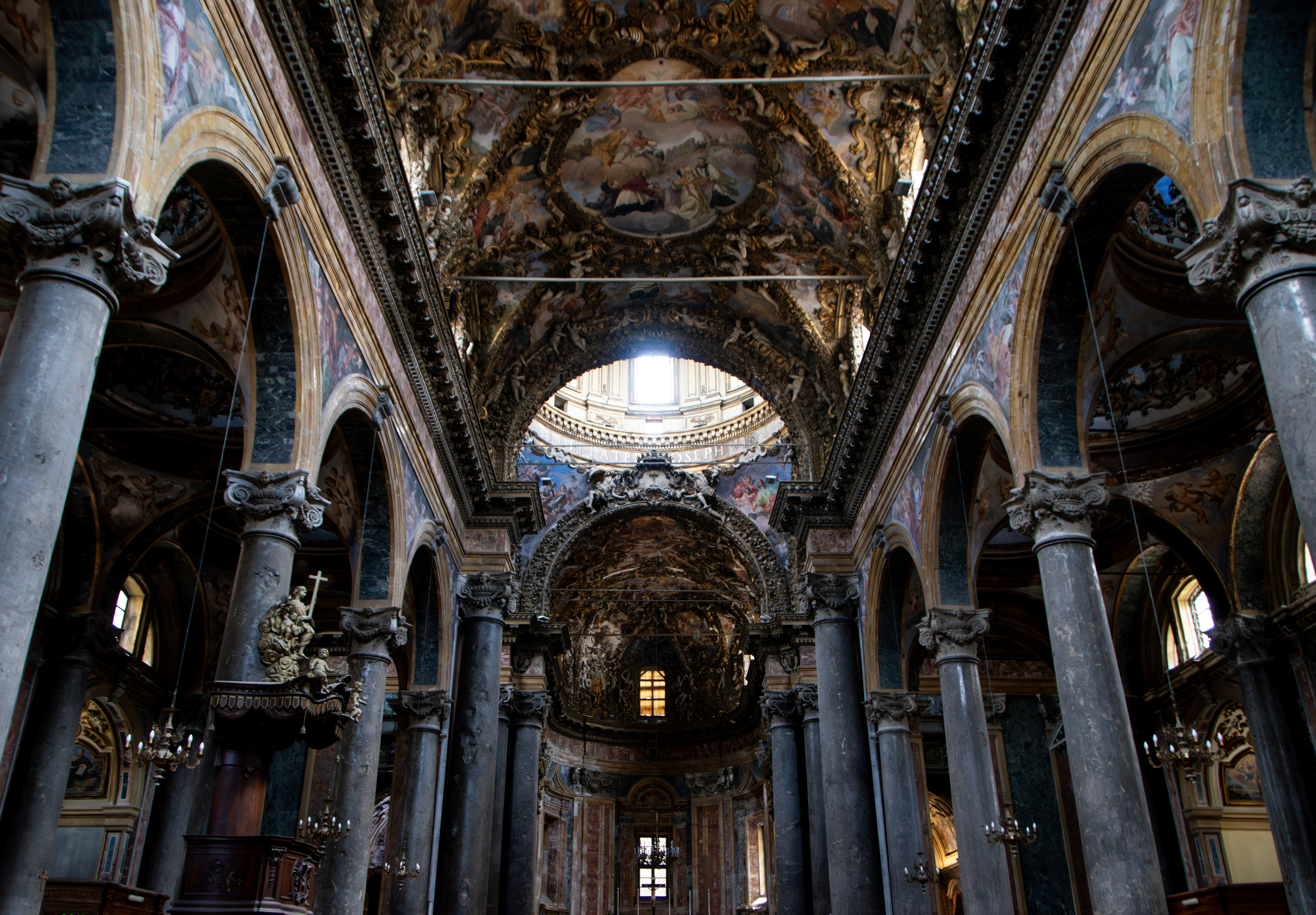
Nave

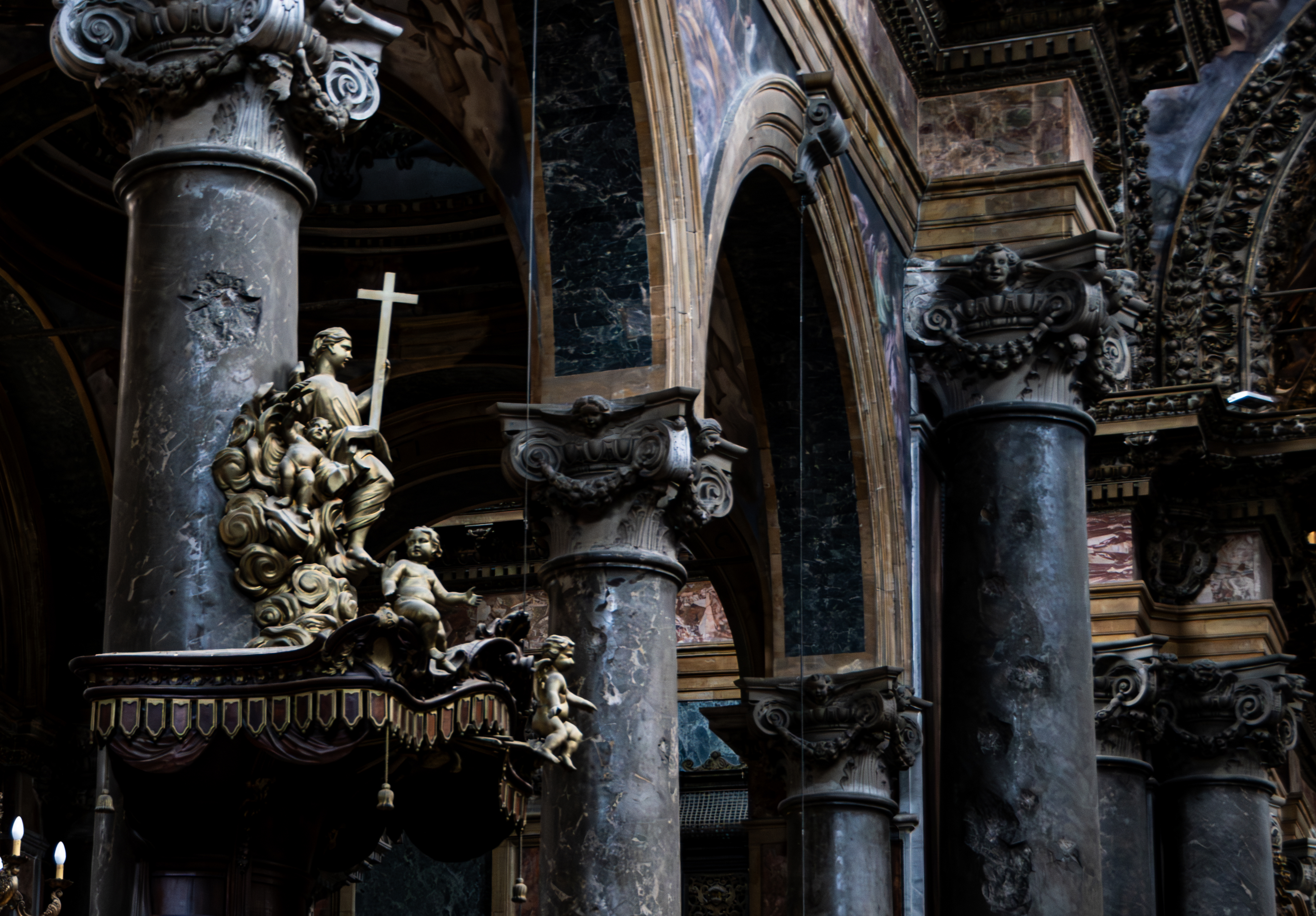
Side of Nave

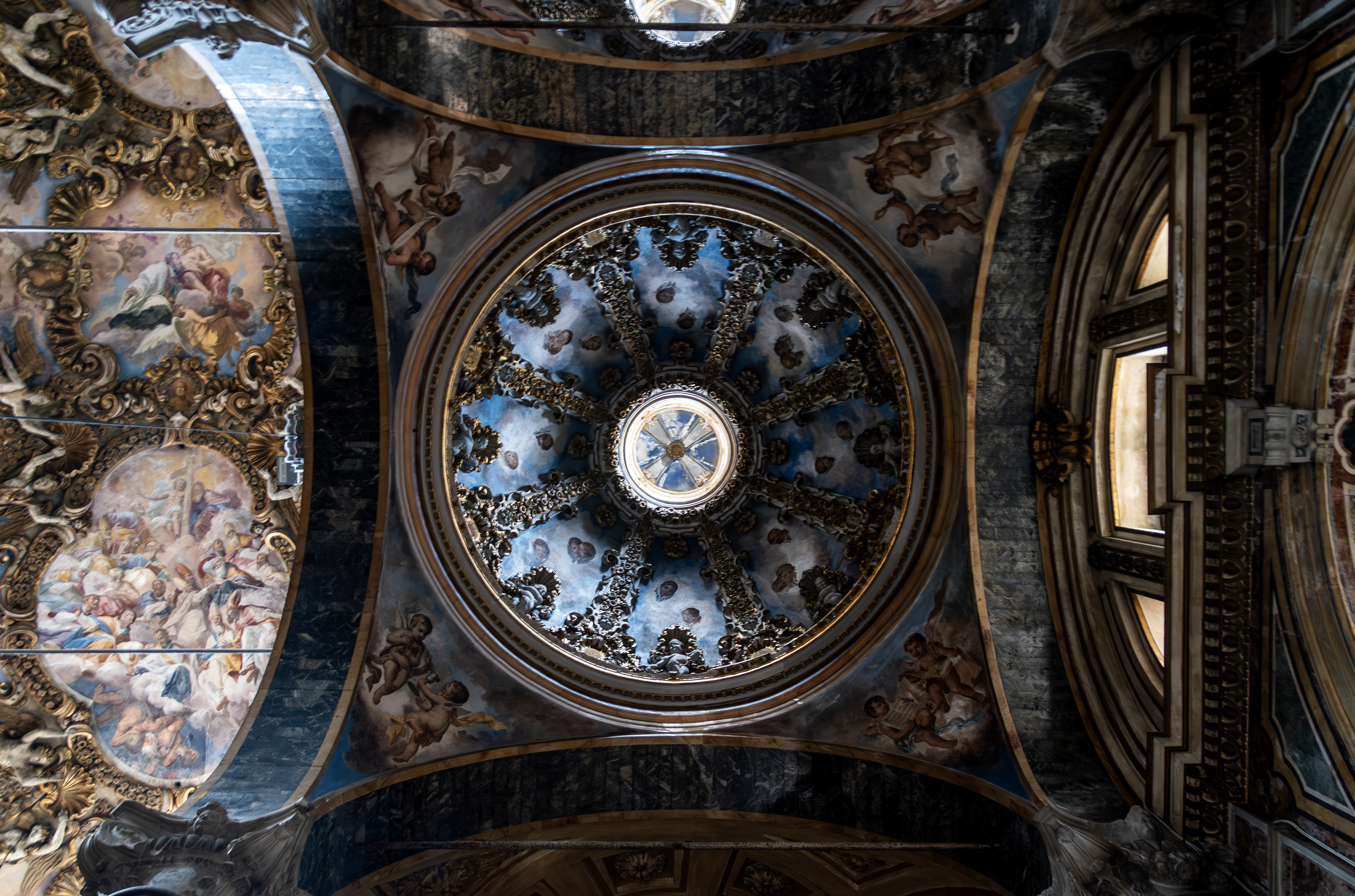
Dome interior

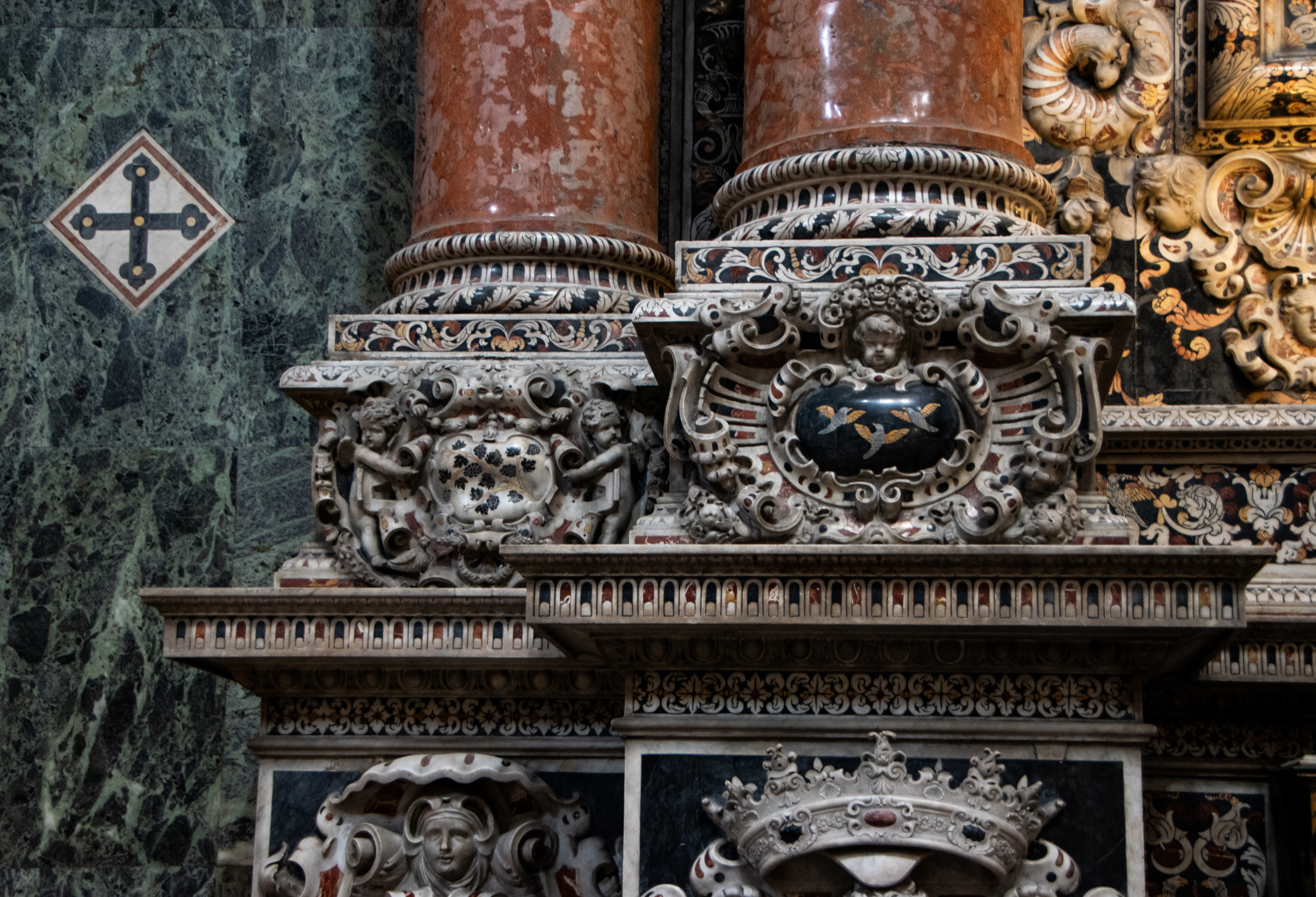
Column bases

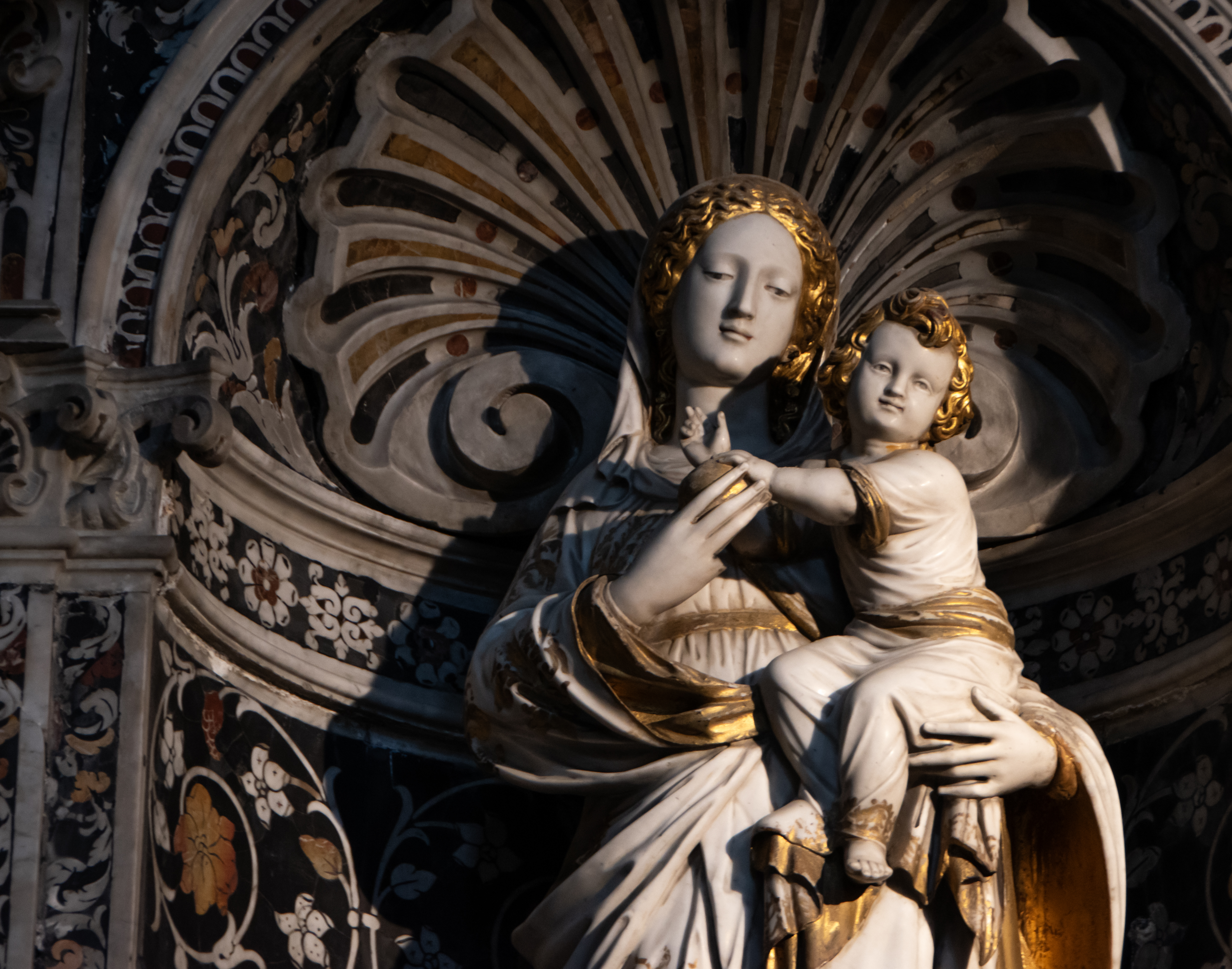
Madonna di Trapani (Antonello Gagini)
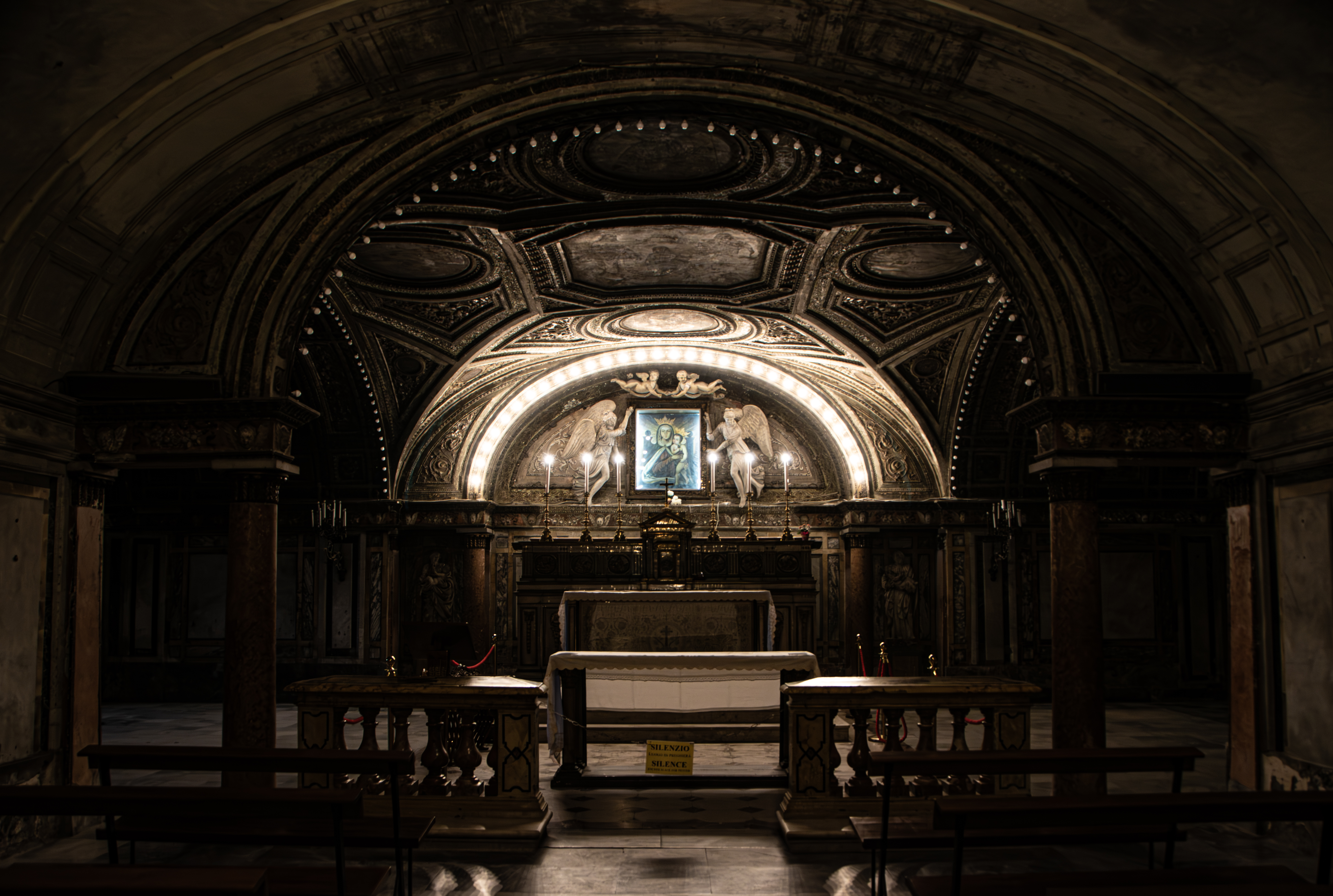
Former church below

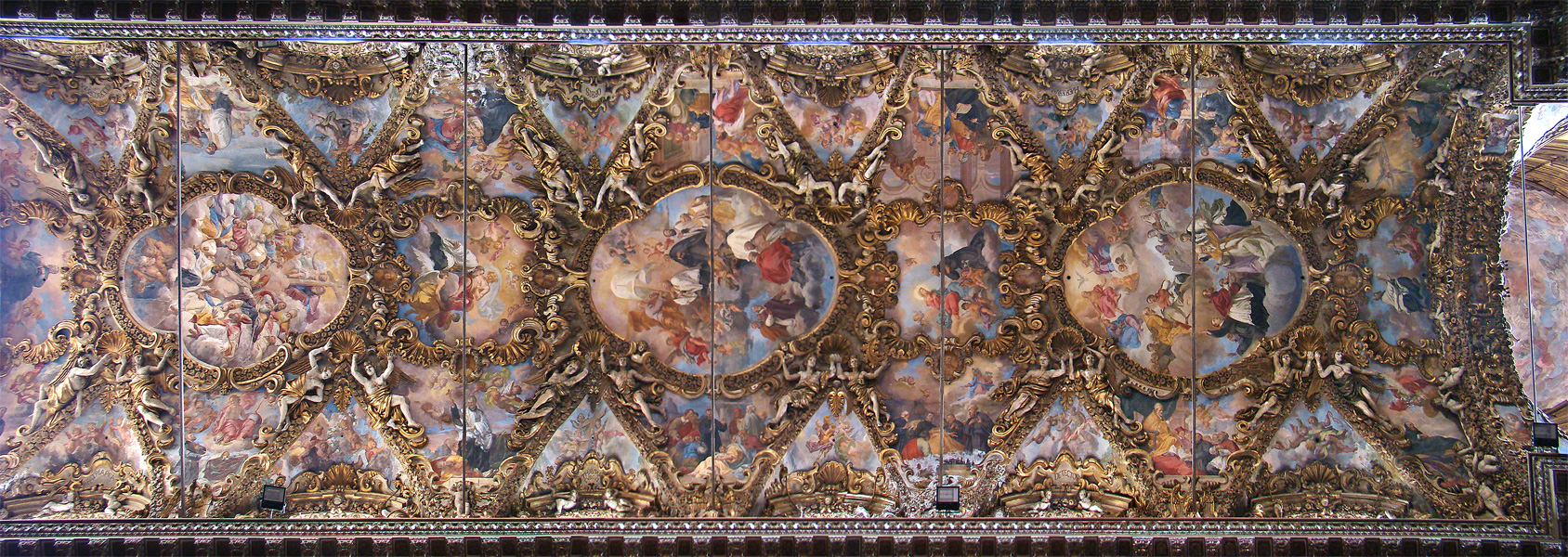
Vault over nave
