= State Archives of Palermo =

State archival institution in Palermo, Italy

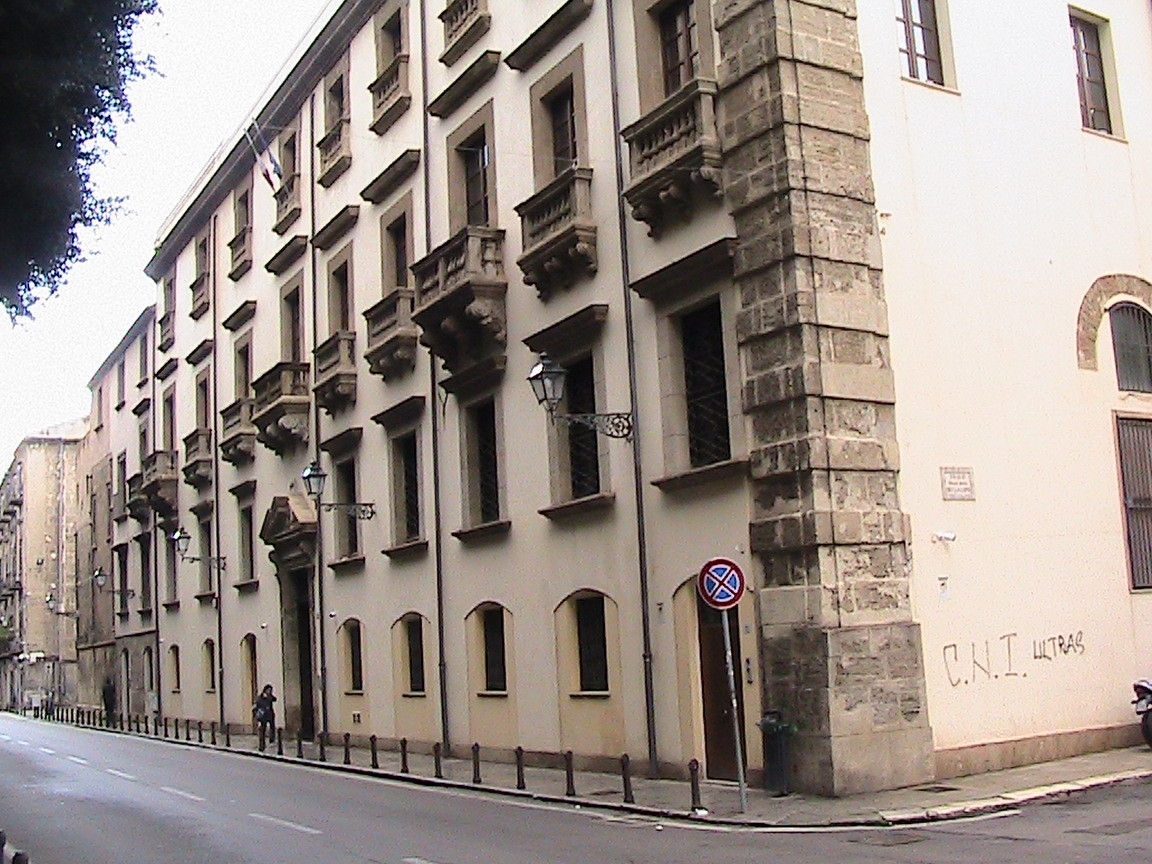
- Interactive map of State Archives of Palermo
- 38°07′10″N 13°22′11″E
- Location: Palermo, Sicily, Italy
- Type: State archive
- Website: http://www.archiviodistatodipalermo.it/

The State Archives of Palermo (Italian: Archivio di Stato di Palermo) is a public archival institution located in Palermo, Sicily, Italy. It preserves historical records produced by governmental and administrative institutions that operated in the city and the surrounding territory and forms part of the national archival network administered by the Italian Ministry of Culture.

The archive preserves documentation relating to the historical institutions of Sicily, including records from the administrations of the Kingdom of Sicily, the Kingdom of the Two Sicilies, and later from the Kingdom of Italy and the Italian Republic. It also holds records produced by courts, state offices, and other public institutions active in Palermo.

== Sources ==
- "Archivio di Stato di Palermo". Sistema archivistico nazionale (in Italian). Istituto centrale per gli archivi.
- "Archivio di Stato di Palermo". Guida generale degli Archivi di Stato italiani. Vol. III. Rome: Ministero per i beni culturali e ambientali. 1986.
- Vesco, Maurizio (2025). Di pietre e di carte. L’Archivio di Stato di Palermo nel convento della Gancia. Roma: Viella.
