= Foro Italico, Palermo =

Park in Palermo, Italy

Coordinates: 38.1181°N 13.3739°E

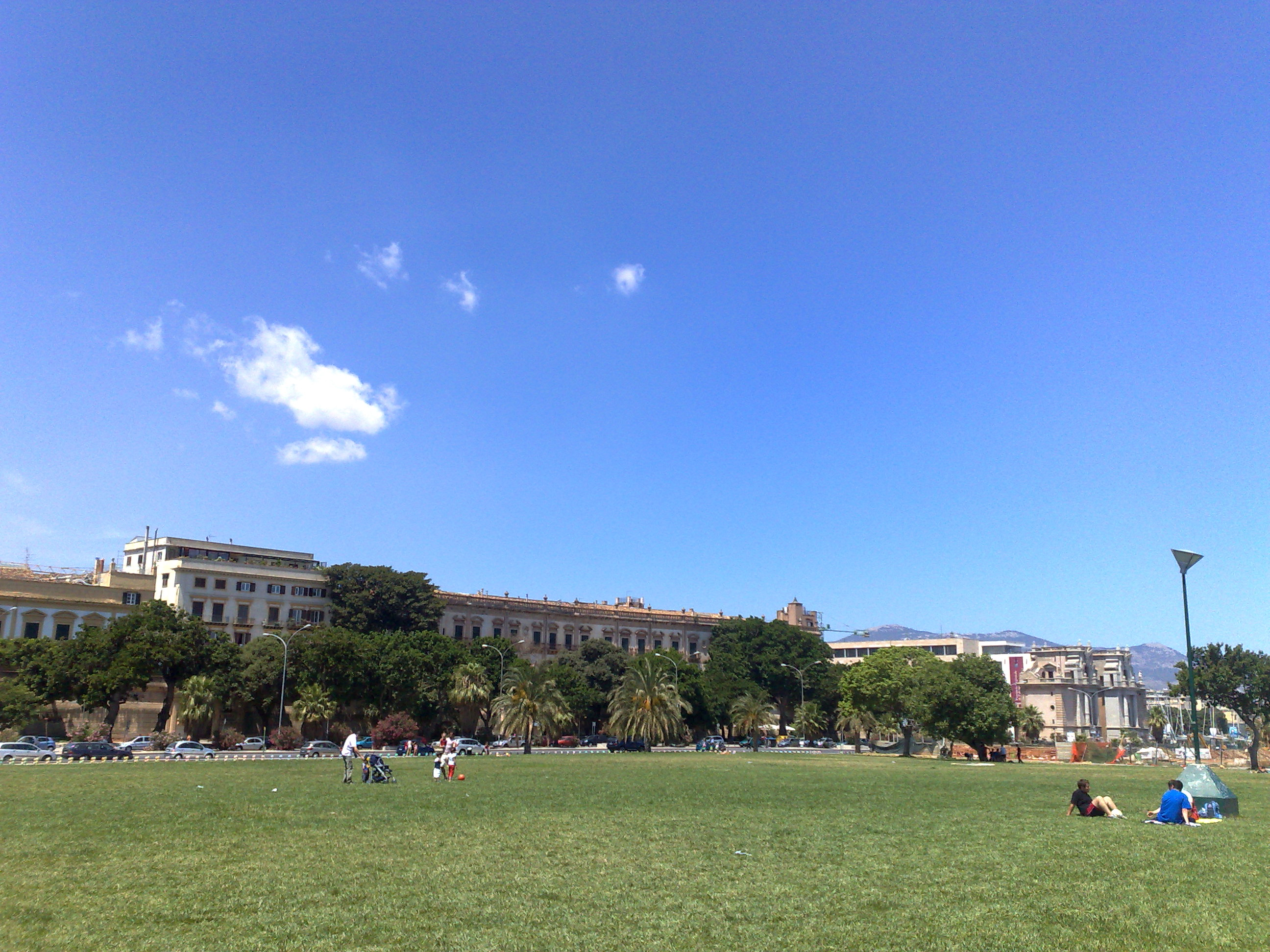
Foro Italico, in the center background is the Palazzo Butera, while to its right is the remnant of the ancient gate called Porta Felice

The Foro Italico (Italian Forum) is a pedestrian path and park along the seafront of Palermo, Sicily, Italy.

In 1582, viceroy Marcantonio Colonna created a walking path in this part of the coast, that became a favorite destination for the leisure of the upper classes of the city in the 17th and 18th centuries. Until the integration of Sicily into the Kingdom of Italy, the park had been called Foro Borbonico or Siciliano, but by the 20th-century, it had been renamed Foro Italico.

It is entirely pedestrian, is approximately 40,000 m^{2} in size, with large lawns, Mediterranean flora of various kinds, benches, trees, ceramic sculptures, a bike path, night lighting and a wide scenic walk along the coast. It was redeveloped in 2003, when the lawn, the pedestrian paths, the public lighting, and an irrigation system were improved. The project was carried out by the technicians of the municipality of Palermo.

Since April 2018 the Foro has hosted a weekly 5km Parkrun.

== Bibliography ==
G. Venturini, Sicilia, Touring Club Italiano, Milano 2002, p. 59.
