= Palazzo Butera, Palermo =

Baroque building in Palermo, Italy

Palazzo Butera
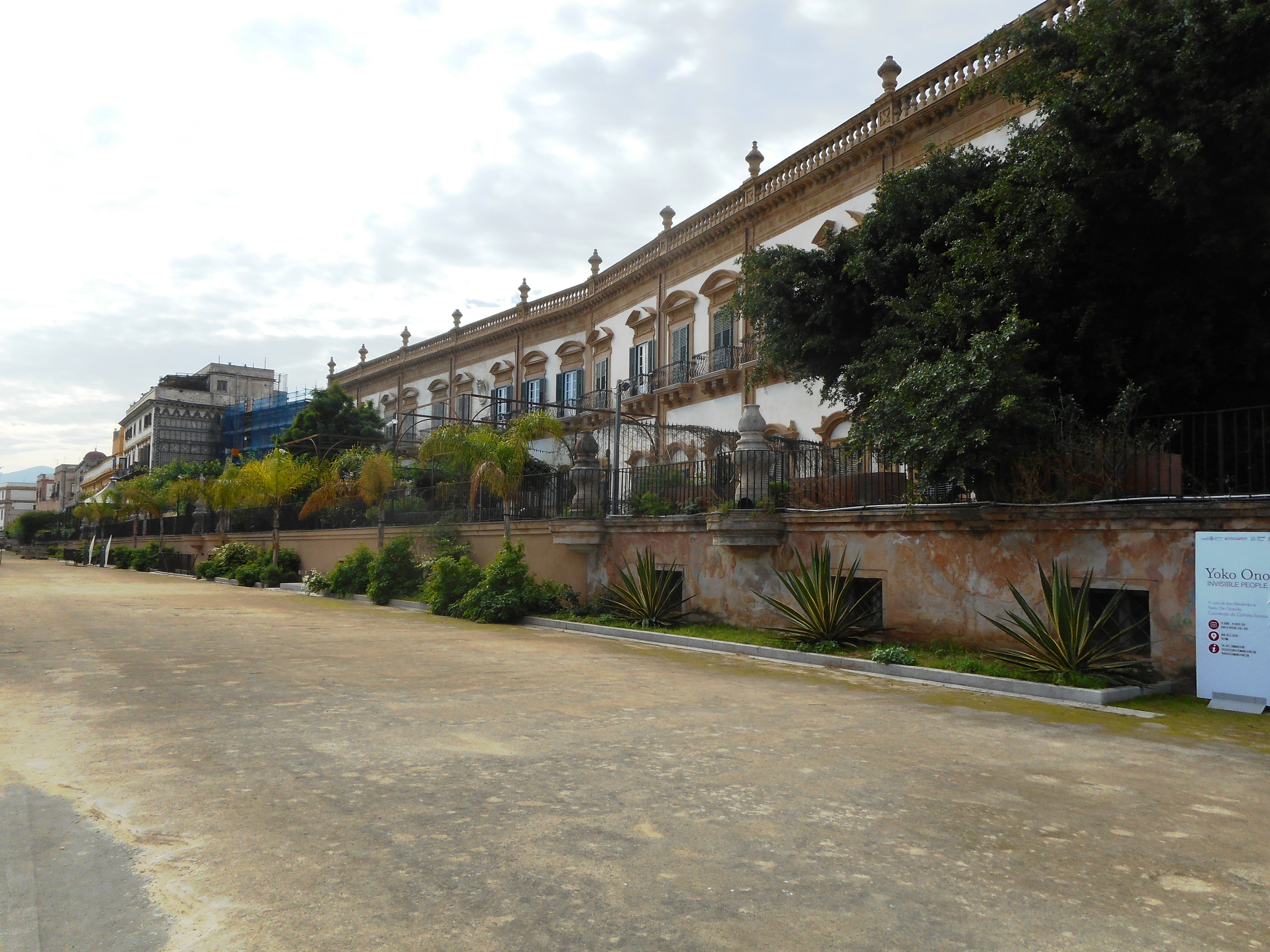
- Façade from the seaside
- Interactive map of the Palazzo Butera area
- Alternative names: Palazzo Butera

General information
- Architectural style: Baroque
- Location: Via Butera, Palermo, Italy, Italy
- Coordinates: 38.11869°N 13.37106°E
- Construction started: 1701

The Palazzo Butera is a Baroque-style aristocratic palace located facing the Mediterranean in the ancient quarter of Kalsa of central Palermo, region of Sicily, Italy. On the shoreside, the long facade has a wide terrace, built atop the base of the former walls and called Passeggiata delle Cattive, in front of this is the park Foro Italico, in front, rising just south of Porta Felice and Via Vittorio Emanuele (the Cassaro); the access to the palace is from the land-side street of Via Butera.

== History ==
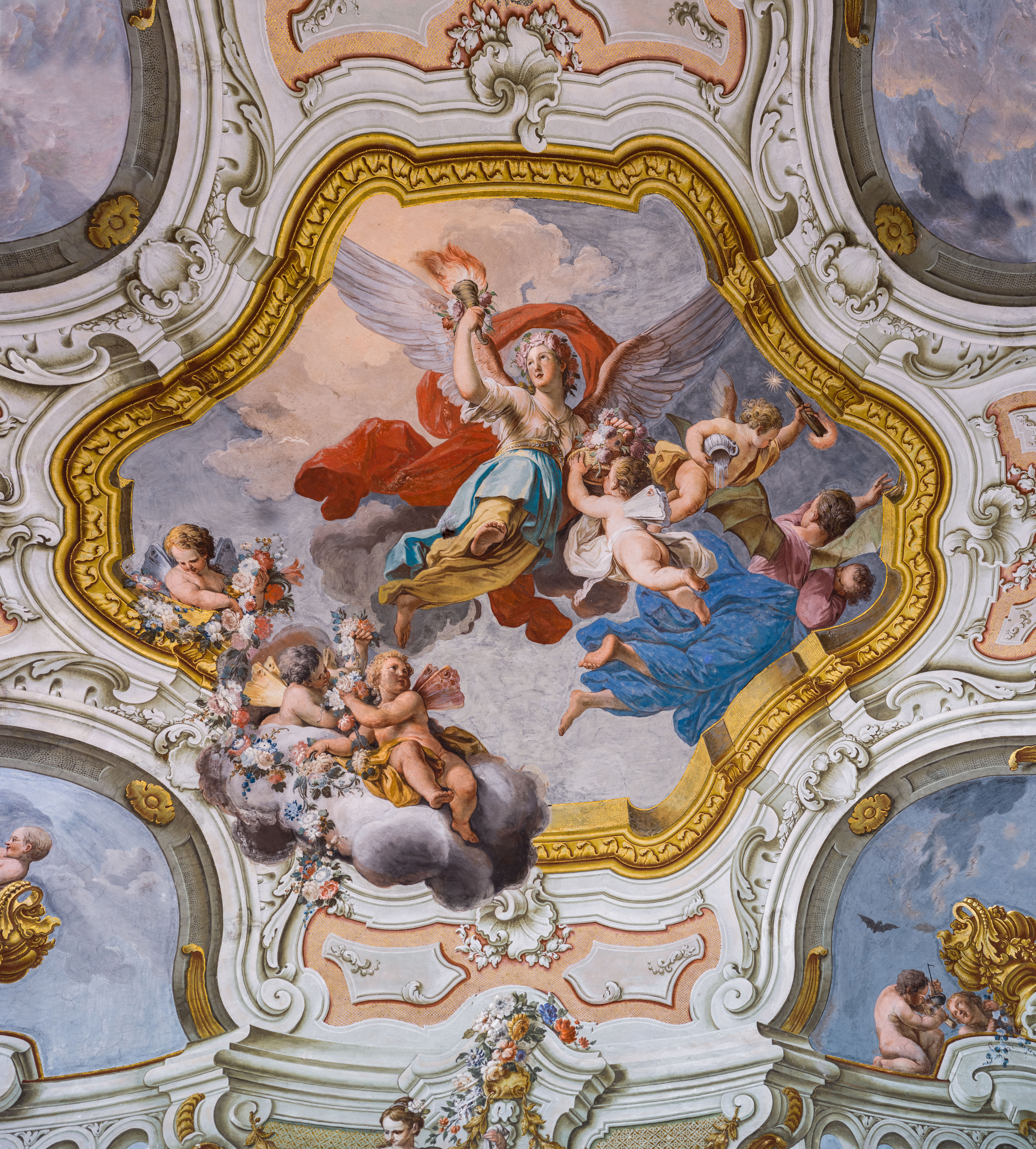
Martorana ceiling frescoes

The privileged site, located at a welcome point from the port into the town, was previously the site of a large home of the Imperatore family. In 1692, it was acquired by Girolamo Branciforte, Marquess of Martini, who commissioned a small palace or casino at the site. In 1718, the son of Girolamo, Ercole Michele Branciforte e Gravina, married Caterina Branciforte e Ventimiglia, daughter of the prince of Butera and Duke of Santa Lucia, Nicolò Placido. This family gained the hereditary title of Prince of Butera. Ercole Michele commissioned designs refurbishment and enlargement of the palace from the architect Giacomo Amato. By 1735, the palace had acquired the roofline balustrade. In 1760, and the palace belonging to the Moncada and adjacent to the Butera palace was incorporated. This allowed for the creation of a large ballroom.

The main entrance to the piano nobile is through marble stairs. The coat of arms of the Branciforte with the lion is prominently displayed. Much of the interior fresco decoration was completed by Gioacchino Martorana and Olivio Sozzi. Some of the interior decorations were designed by Ferdinando Fuga during 1728 al 1741, and the stucco and artisan construction led by Giuseppe Li Gotti. In 1759, a large fire destroyed a large portion of the palace, leading to a new refurbishment under the patronage of prince Ercole Branciforte. The architect Paolo Vivaldi was used for some of the designs. The refurbishment was carried on by Ercole's son, prince Salvatore Branciforti. Some of the fresco decorations were pursued by Olivio Sozzi, Emanuele and Elia Interguglielmi, Gioacchino and Pietro Martorana, and the quadraturista Gaspare Fumagalli. Francesco Alaimo completed some of the stuccowork.

In 1773, Ercole Michele Branciforti e Pignatelli, prince of Pietraperzia, aligned with a local rebellion in Sicily and was jailed by the viceroy Caracciolo. He appears to have been a scholarly fan of the new sciences and enlightenment, seeing a Montgolfier-type hot air ballon released from the terrace in 1784. He also hosted at the palace visitors like Goethe, Hackert, Dominique-Vivant Denon, Jean-Pierre Houel and Friedrich Münter.

Upon the death of Stefania Branciforte, last princess of Butera, the titles were transferred to the Lanza family, princes of Trabia and Dukes of Camastra. The prince Pietro Lanza Galletti and his wife Giulia Florio d’Ondes still resided in the palace during World War II; two of their sons died during the war. After 1950, the palace had various owners of local government institutions, housing a tourism institute. In 2016, the palace was purchased by the gallery owner Massimo Valsecchi and his wife Francesca, who have led a restoration of the structure for use as museum and cultural events.
