= Tommaso Pollace =

Italian painter (1748–1830)

Tommaso Pollace (1748 – 1830) was an Italian painter of the Neoclassical style, active mainly in Sicily.

== Biography ==
Pollace was born in Palermo and died in Caltanissetta. He trained in Palermo in the circle of Vito d'Anna. His first paintings were for the Mother Church of Alcamo. In 1782, he began painting in a studio at Termini Imerese painting in Palermo for churches and for the Palazzo Celestri di Santacroce on Via Maqueda, and the Marchese of Santacroce's Villa di Mezzomonreale, now a military hospital. Pollace painted a Martyrdom of St John the Evangelist for the church of Santa Maria di Gesù in Petralia Soprana.

The competition in Palermo from other artists including Francesco Manno, Elia Interguglielmi, and Grano prompted him to obtain commissions in the 19th century at Scicli, Modica, Ragusa, Mazzarino, Barrafranca, Gangi, Agira, and San Cataldo.
