= Martorana (surname) =

Martorana is a surname. Notable people with the surname include:

- Bernardo Martorana (1846–after 1891), Italian painter
- Clare Martorana (born 1960), American politician
- Gioacchino Martorana (1736–1779), Italian painter, son of Pietro
- Mirko Manuele Martorana (born 1994), known as Rkomi, Italian rapper and singer-songwriter
- Pietro Martorana (1705–1759), Italian painter
