= Virgin and Child (Filocamo) =

Paintingby Antonio Filocamo

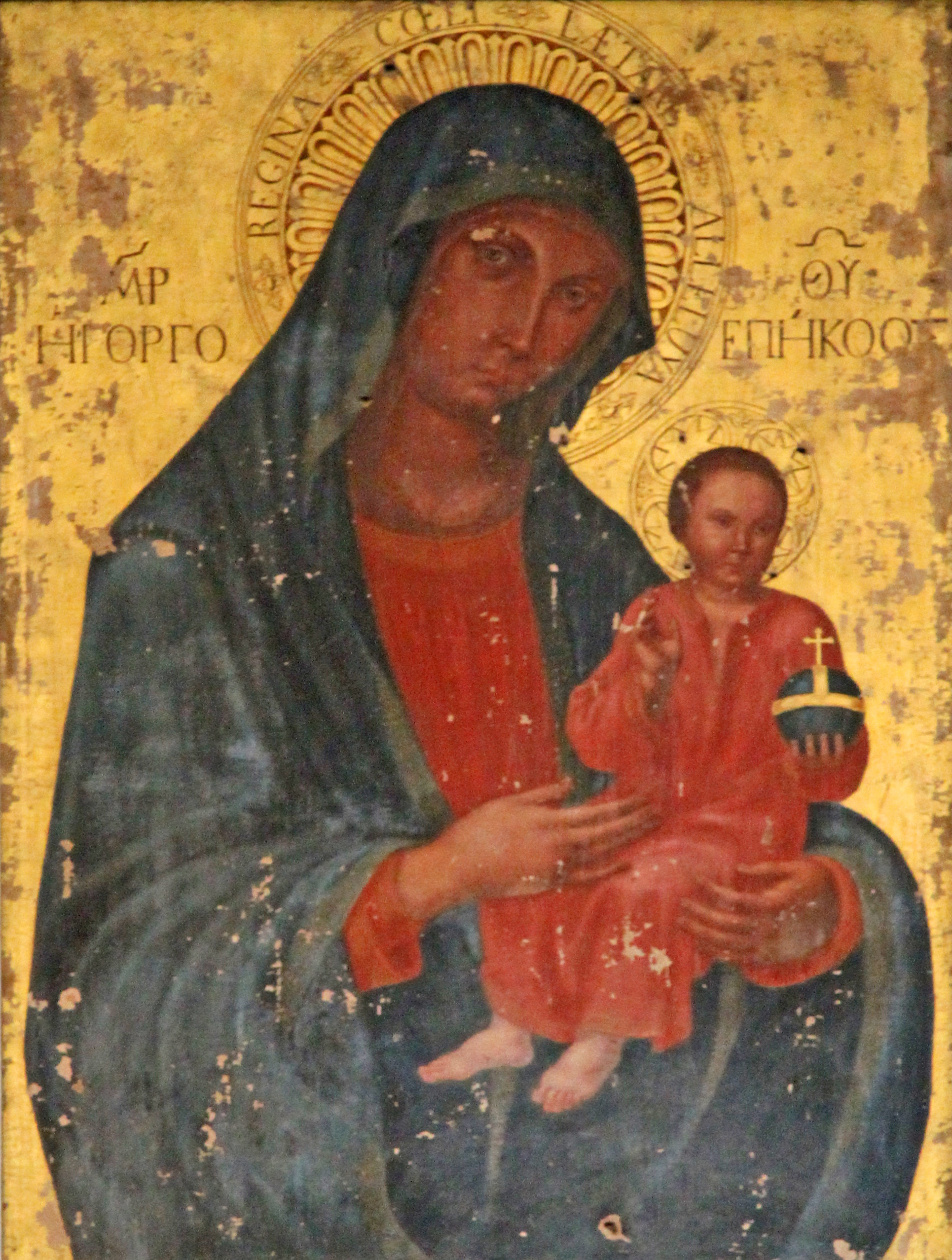
Virgin and Child (c. 1741) by Antonio Filocamo

The Virgin and Child (La S. Vergine col Bambino) is an Italian wall painting by Antonio Filocamo, in Palermo Cathedral in Sicily. It was painted c. 1741, but uses the gold background more characteristic of medieval paintings.
