= Palazzo Celestri di Santacroce =

Celestri di Santacroce, or Sant'Elia, palace
- Palazzo Celestri di Santacroce, or Sant'Elia
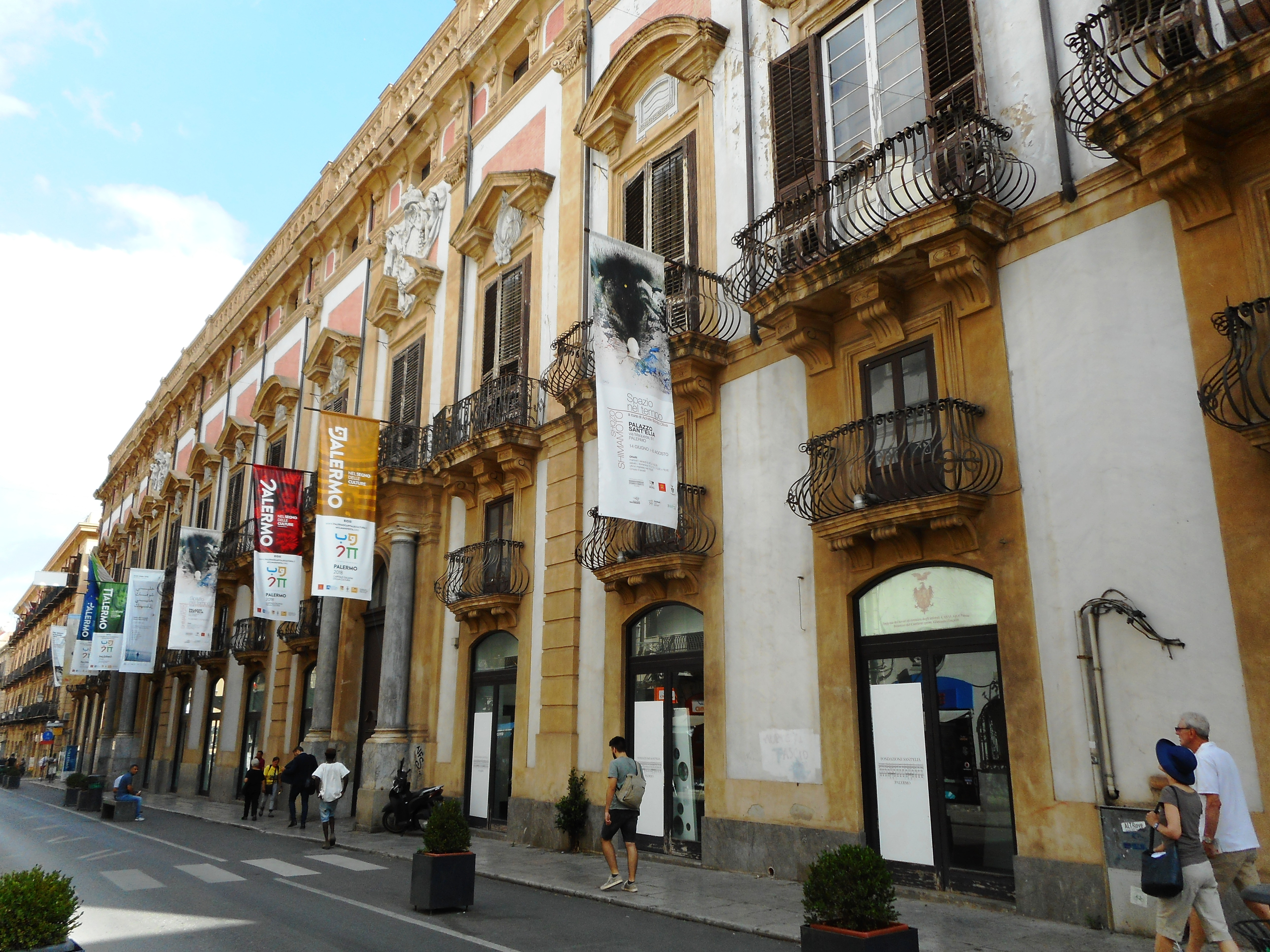
- Façade of the palace on Via Maqueda
- Interactive map of the Celestri di Santacroce, or Sant'Elia, palace area
- Alternative names: Palazzo Sant'Elia

General information
- Architectural style: Baroque
- Location: Palermo, Italy, Italy
- Coordinates: 38.11238°N 13.36367°E
- Completed: 1760

The Palazzo Celestri di Santacroce, also known as the Palazzo Sant'Elia, is a Baroque-style aristocratic palace located on via Maqueda 90 in the ancient quarter of Kalsa of central Palermo, region of Sicily, Italy. Once the urban palace of a wealthy and prominent family, a large portion of the palace is now used for exhibitions and private functions. The palace is diagonal to the Southeast of the Palazzo Comitini, and just a block north of the church of the Assunta.

== History ==
The palace was built atop and enlarging a prior structure known as the Palazzo Imbarbara. The present structure was commissioned by Giambattista Celestri, 1st Marchese di Santa Croce, along with his brother Tommaso. Construction began in 1756, with the main layout and facade dictated by the designs by the architect and engineer Nicolò Anito. By 1760, the work proceeded under Giovanbattista Cascione Vaccarini, who determined some of the decoration, including the stuccowork, of the main courtyard and of the facade.

In 1866, Marianna Celestri di Santa Croce, the last heir, willed the property to her cousin Romualdo Trigona, prince of Sant'Elia. By 1984, the palace had become dilapidated, and was purchased by the Provincial government, who has funded the restoration.

== Description ==
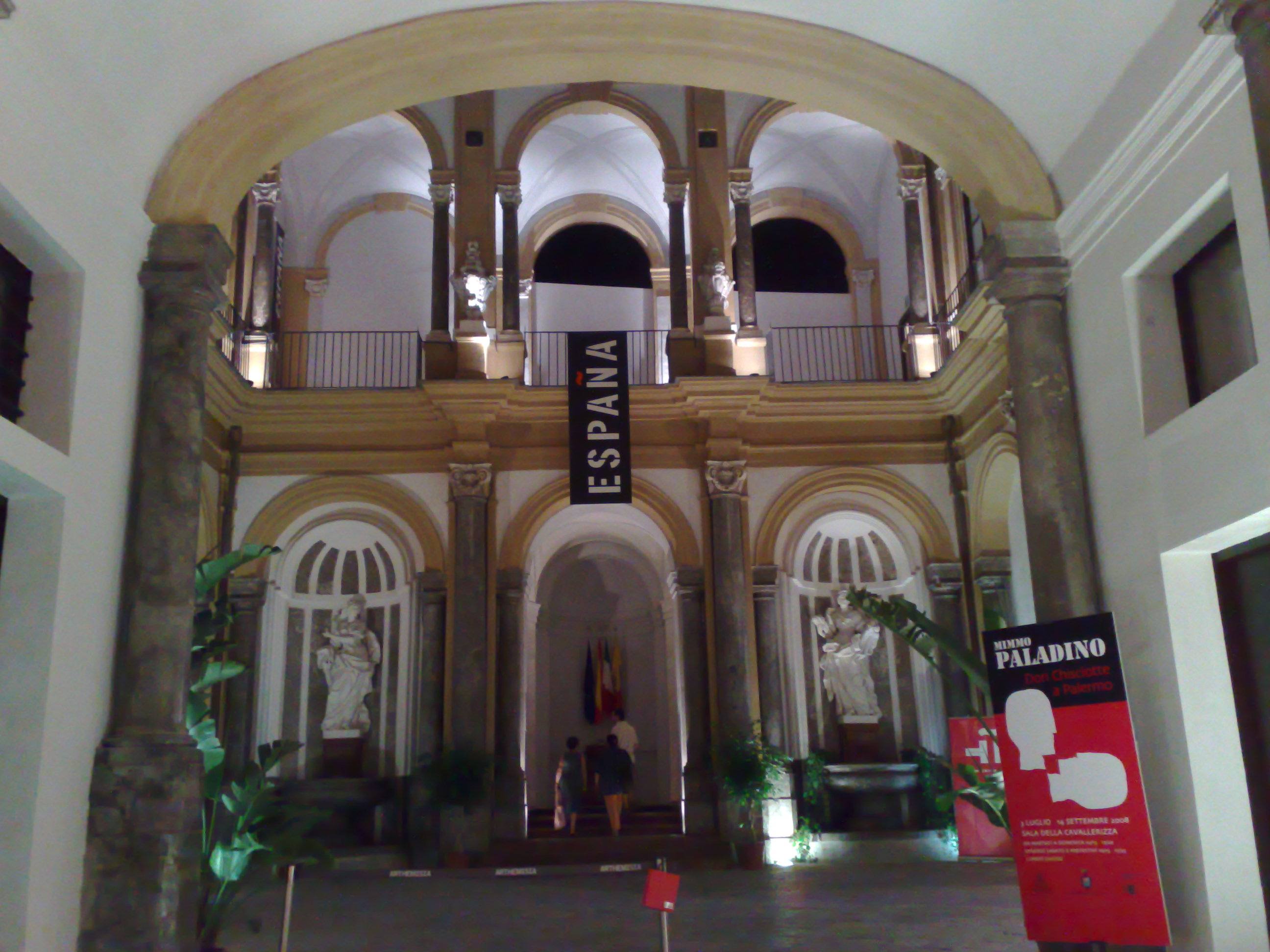
View of main courtyard

The baroque facade has two entrances, both with protruding grey marble doric columns. The entrance portal is surmounted by a gargoyle at the keystone. All the balconies have elegant brackets and iron grills. The piano nobile balconies have alternating triangular and rounded tympani, containing decorative bas-relief portraits or decorations. The interior courtyards are rich in arcades and stucco statuary and decoration.

The interior frescoes of the piano nobile are described by some as possessing subtle symbolism of the order of Free Masonry. The authors of the frescoes include Gioacchino Martorana and Elia Interguglielmi.
