= Chiesa dell'Assunta, Palermo =

Roman Catholic church in Sicily, Italy

Church of the Madonna of the Assumption
- Chiesa della Madonna Assunta (in Italian)
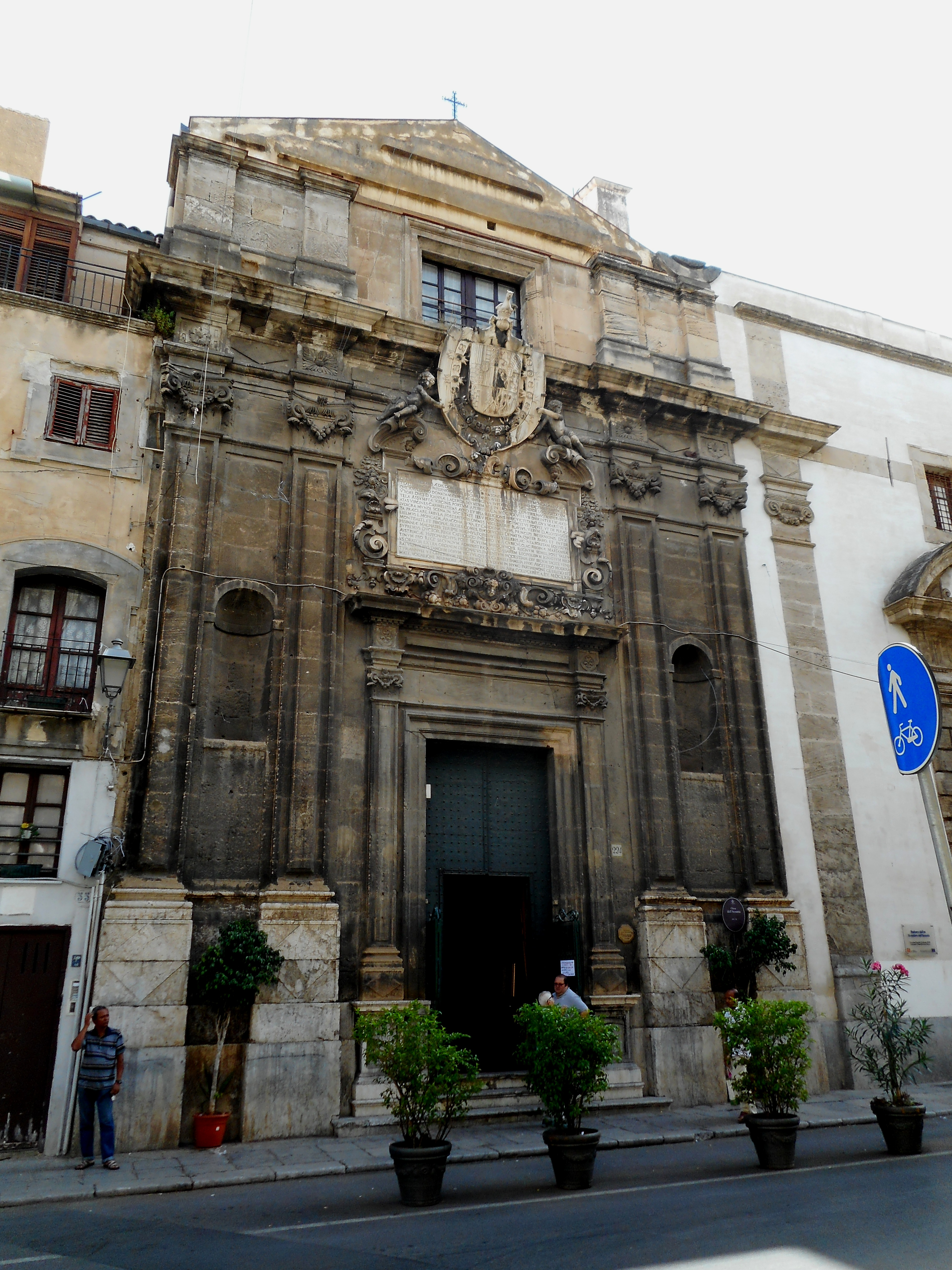
- Facade

Religion
- Affiliation: Roman Catholic
- Province: Archdiocese of Palermo
- Rite: Roman Rite

Location
- Location: Palermo, Italy
- Interactive map of Church of the Madonna of the Assumption
- Coordinates: 38.11167°N 13.36413°E

Architecture
- Style: Baroque

The Italian: Chiesa della Madonna Assunta or the Church of the Virgin of the Assumption is a Baroque-style, Roman Catholic church located on Via Maqueda 59-61 in the ancient quarter of Kalsa in central Palermo, region of Sicily, Italy. It rises a block south along via Maqueda from the Palazzo Sant'Elia.

== History and description ==
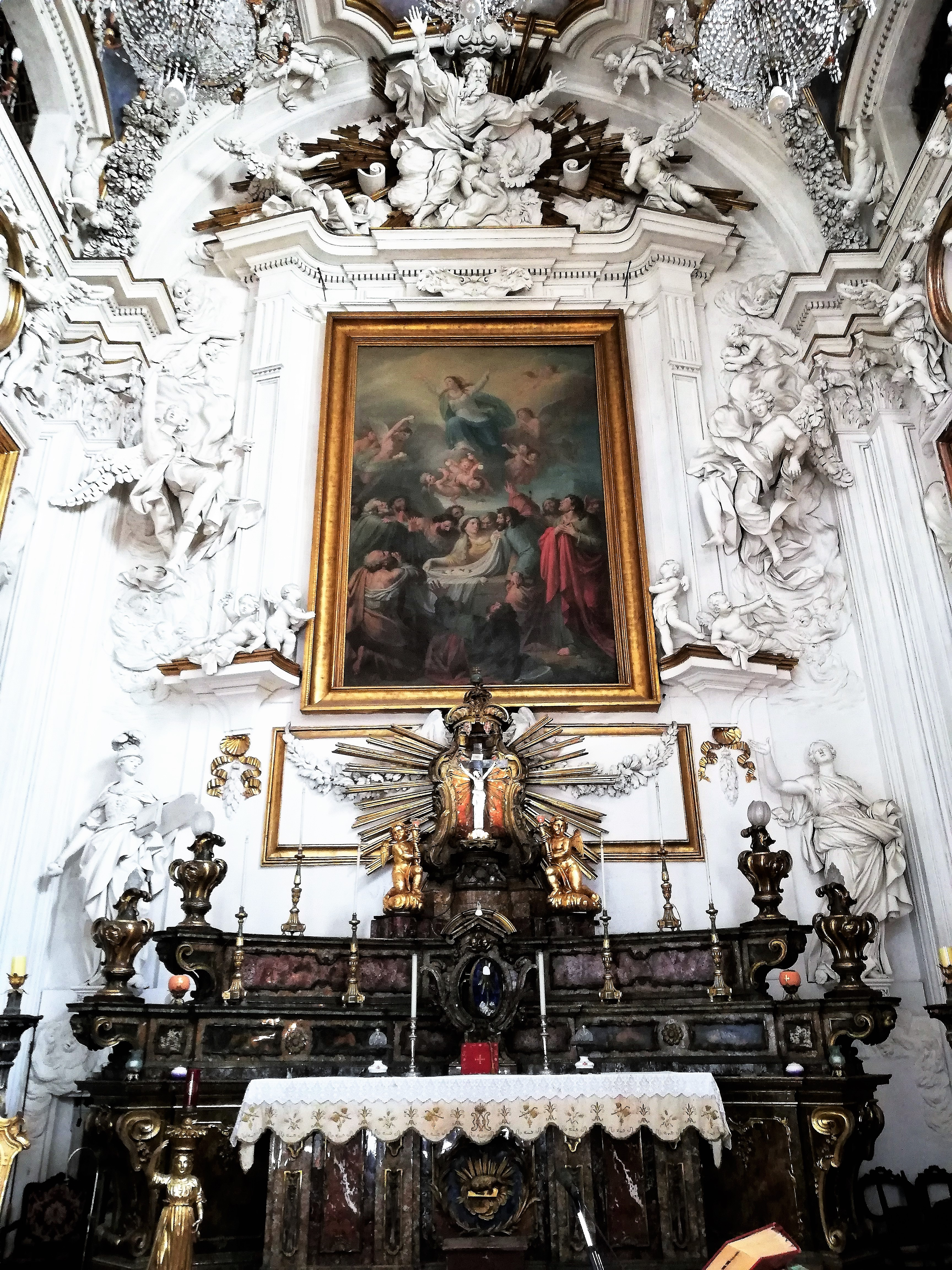
Apse stuccoes with altarpiece depicting the Assumption of the Virgin received above by a stucco God the Father

The church was built between 1625-1628, adjacent to a former Discalced Carmelite monastery. Above the portal is the coat of arms of the Moncada family, that patronized its construction. Around the shield is the necklace of the prestigious Order of the Golden Fleece, awarded in 1607 by the King of Spain to Antonio de Moncada, 4th prince of Paterno.

In the early 17th-century, the monastery once included Juana De la Cerda, daughter of the Duke of Mendinaceli and the wife of Antonio Aragona Moncada, Duke of Bivona and Montalto and prince di Paternò. Her husband joined the Jesuit order.

The interior is richly decorated with stuccoes, including a relief depicting Angels and the Holy Father by Giacomo Serpotta. Other artists in the church included Giacomo's brother Giuseppe and his son Procopio.

Among the paintings in the church are works by Antonio Grano and Filippo Tancredi. The latter depicted a Glory of St Teresa of Avila on the nave ceiling. The frescoes below the choir were painted by Guglielmo Borremans. The main altar is made with precious stones, and flanked by stucco statues of Faith and Charity by Procopio Serpotta. The altarpiece depicting the Madonna of the Assumption (1800) was painted by Giuseppe Patricolo.
