= Pietro Martorana =

Italian painter

- Born: 1705; Palermo, Sicily, Italy
- Died: 1759 (aged 53–54); Palermo

Pietro Martorana (1705–1759) was a Sicilian painter. He was the father of Gioacchino Martorana, father-in-law of Gaspare Fumagalli, and a member of an extended family of decorators and artists from Palermo.

Martorana was born, lived and died in Palermo, in the Mediterranean island of Sicily. He painted cycles of frescoes in the churches of San Carlo, Santa Chiara and Santa Rosalia, and in the Duomo. In 1736 he collaborated with Olivio Sozzi on frescoes in the Palazzo Butera.
