= Palermo Cathedral =

Cathedral in Palermo, Sicily

Metropolitan Cathedral of the Assumption of Virgin Mary Cattedrale metropolitana della Santa Vergine Maria Assunta
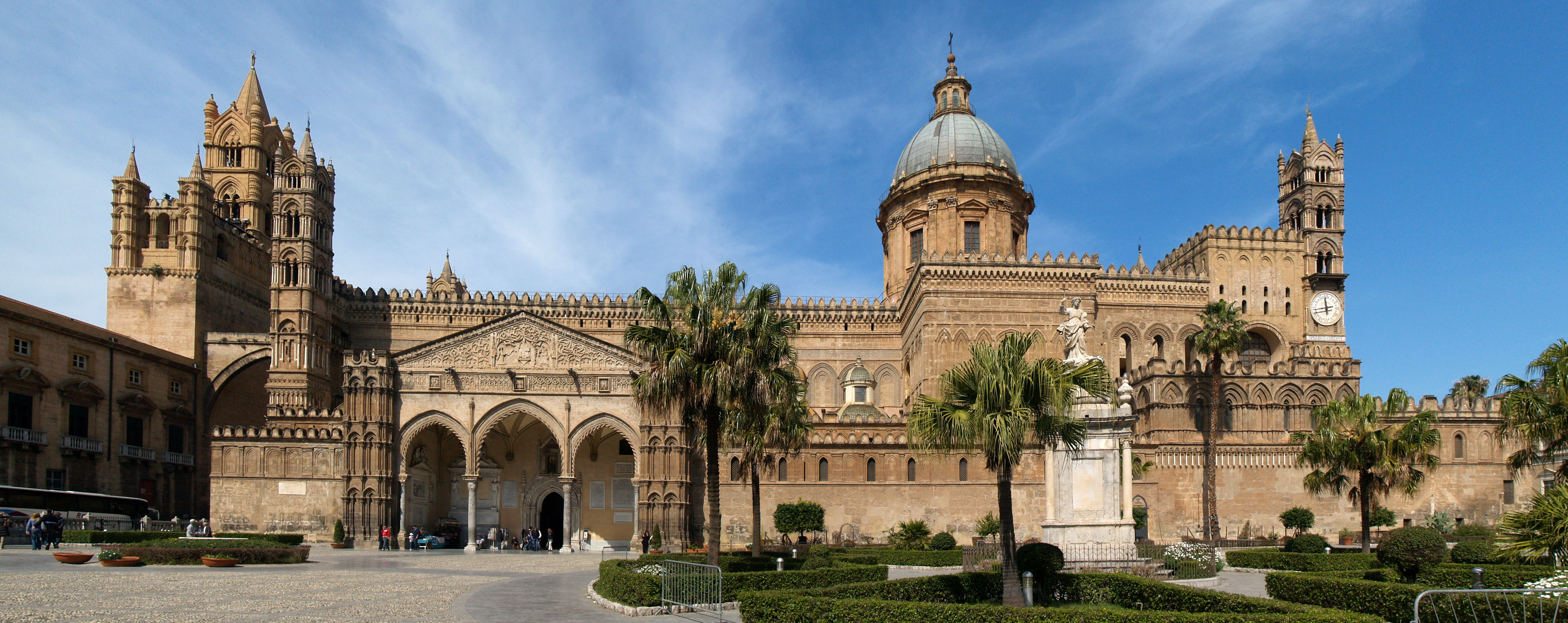
- Palermo Cathedral

Religion
- Affiliation: Roman Catholic Church
- Province: Archdiocese of Palermo
- Ecclesiastical or organisational status: Cathedral
- Status: Active

Location
- Location: Palermo, Italy
- Interactive map of Metropolitan Cathedral of the Assumption of Virgin Mary; Cattedrale metropolitana della Santa Vergine Maria Assunta
- Coordinates: 38°06′52″N 13°21′22″E

Architecture
- Type: Church
- Style: Norman, Islamic, Gothic, Baroque, Neoclassical
- Groundbreaking: 1185
- Completed: completed in the Middle Ages but with subsequent additions until the eighteenth century
- UNESCO World Heritage Site
- Official name: Arab-Norman Palermo and the Cathedral Churches of Cefalù and Monreale
- Type: Cultural
- Criteria: ii, iv
- Designated: 2015 (39th session)
- Reference no.: 1487
- State Party: Italy
- Region: Europe and North America

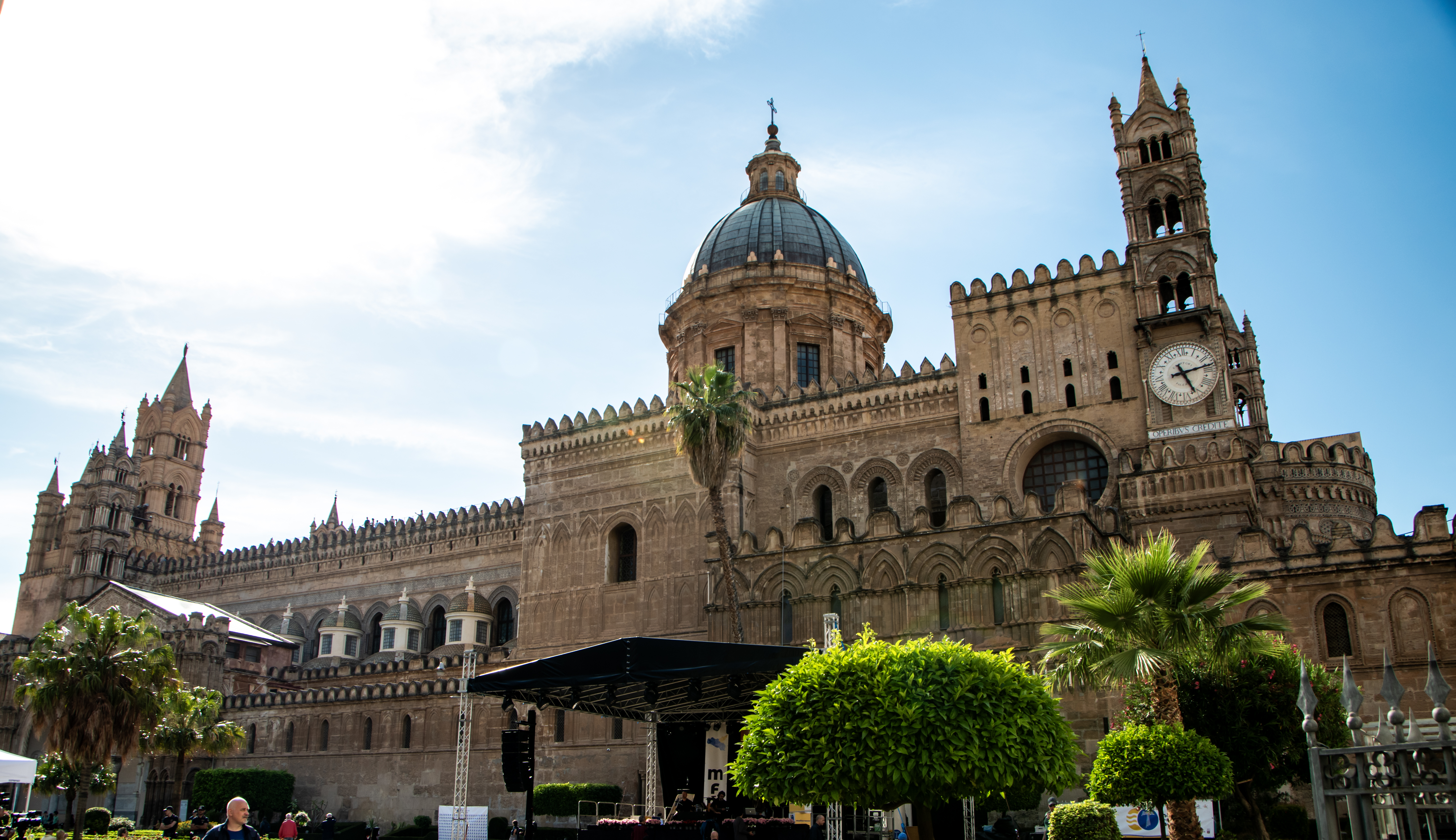
Façade as viewed from main courtyard

Palermo Cathedral is the cathedral church of the Roman Catholic Archdiocese of Palermo, located in Palermo, Sicily, southern Italy. It is dedicated to the Assumption of the Virgin Mary. As an architectural complex, it is characterized by the presence of different styles, due to a long history of additions, alterations and restorations, the last of which occurred in the 18th century.

== History ==
The church was erected in 1185 by Walter Ophamil, the Norman archbishop of Palermo and King William II's minister, on the area of an earlier Byzantine basilica. By all accounts this earlier church was founded by Pope Gregory I and was later turned into a mosque by the Arabs after their conquest of the city in the 9th century. Ophamil is buried in a sarcophagus in the church's crypt. The medieval edifice had a basilica plan with three apses.

The upper orders of the corner towers were built between the 14th and the 15th centuries, while in the early Renaissance period the southern porch was added. The present neoclassical appearance dates from the work carried out over the two decades 1781 to 1801, supervised by Ferdinando Fuga and Giuseppe Venanzio Marvuglia. During this period the great retable by Gagini, decorated with statues, friezes and reliefs, was destroyed and the sculptures moved to different parts of the basilica. Also by Fuga are the great dome emerging from the main body of the building, and the smaller domes covering the aisles' ceilings.

== Overview ==
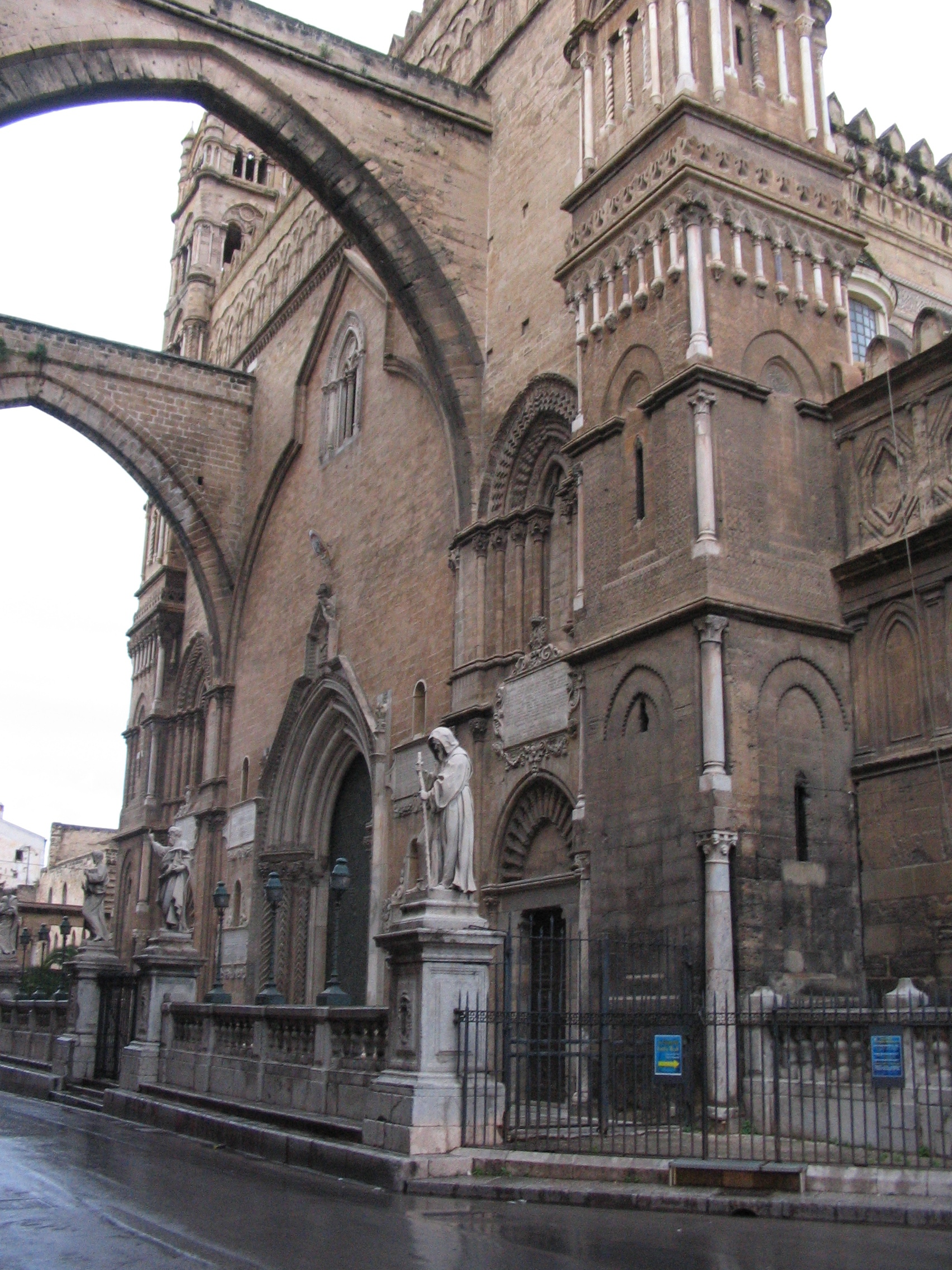
The main façade, connected with arcades to the Archbishops' Palace

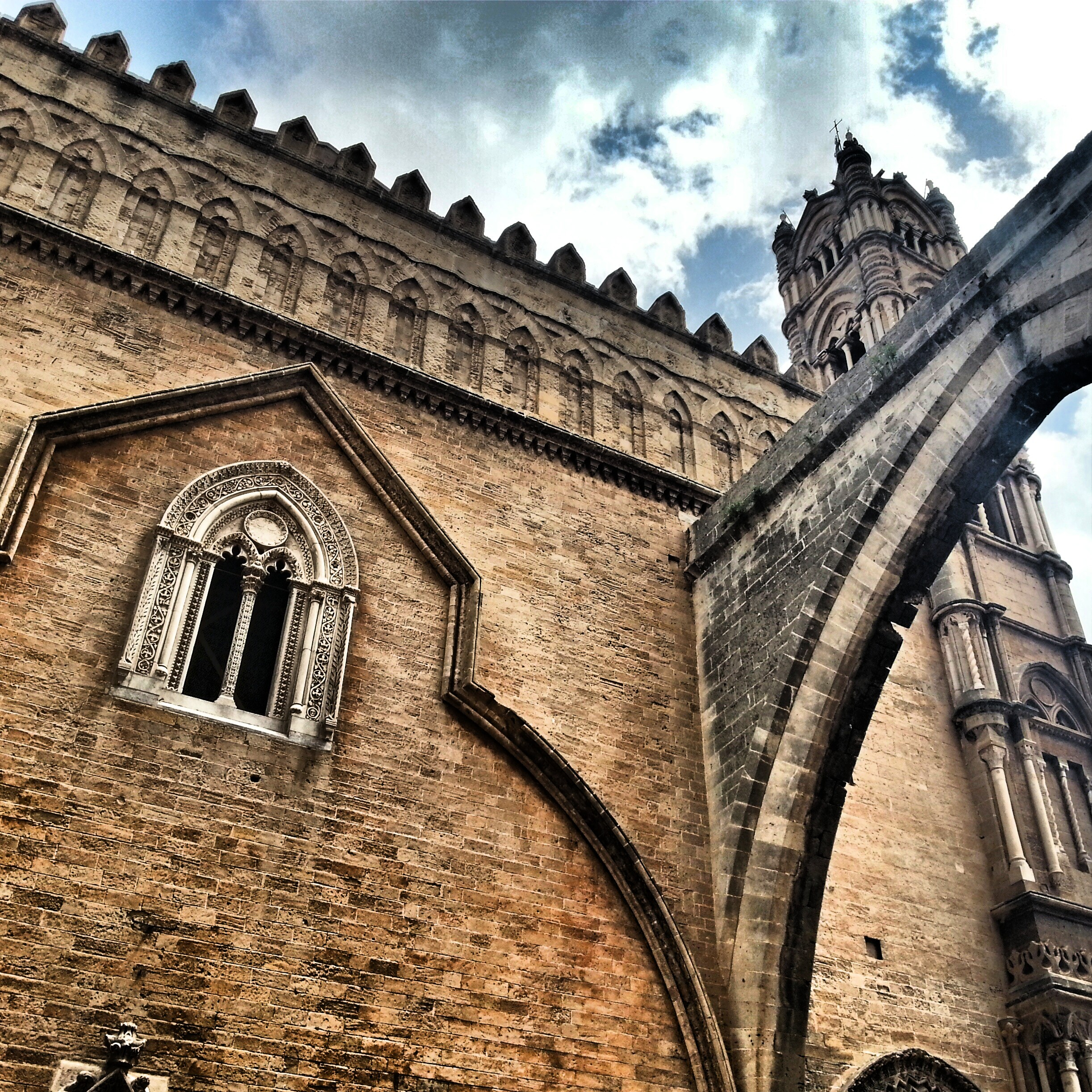
The window over the west entrance; you can see one of the two arcades that connect the western façade to the opposite bell tower

The western entrance is on the current Via Matteo Bonello, and has the appearance set in the 14th and 15th centuries. It is flanked by two towers and has a Gothic portal surmounted by a niche with a precious 15th-century Madonna. Two lintelled ogival arcades, stepping over the street, connect the western façade to the bell tower, which is annexed to the Archbishops Palace (now Museo Diocesano). This has a squared appearance adorned in the upper part by a fine crown of smaller belfries and small arcades.

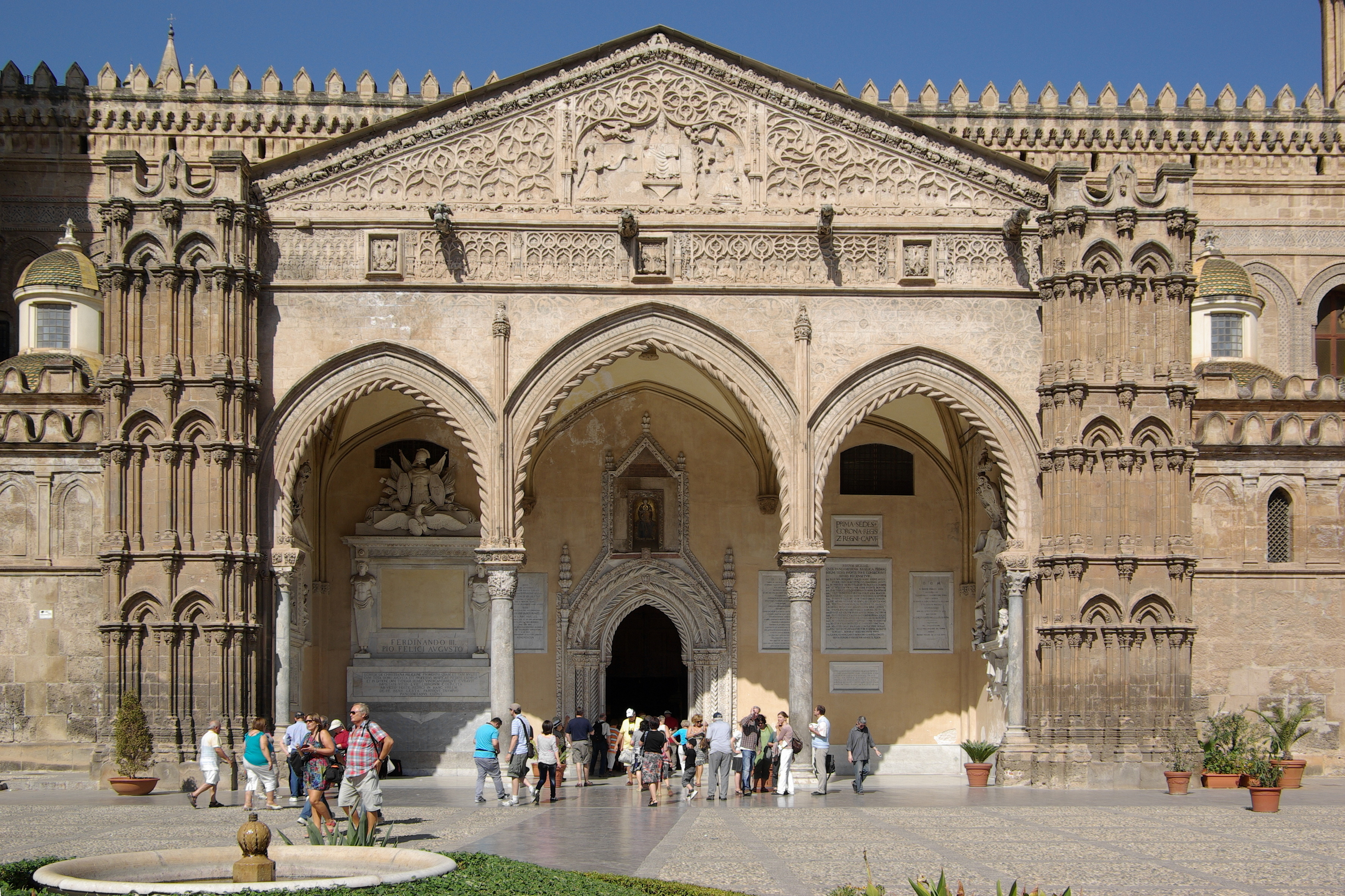
The famous portico by Antonio Gambara

The south side has outstretching turrets and a wide portico (the current main entrance) in Gothic-Catalan style, with three arcades, erected around 1465 and opening to the square. The first column on the left belonged to the original basilica and the subsequent mosque, as evidenced by the Qur'an verse carved on it. The carved portal of this entrance was executed between 1426 and 1430 by Antonio Gambara, while the magnificent wooden leaves are by Francesco Miranda (1432). The mosaic portraying the Madonna is from the 13th century, while the two monuments on the walls, works of the early 18th century, represent the Bourbon king Charles III and Victor Amadeus II of Sardinia, both of whom were crowned here (the latter with his first wife, Anne Marie d'Orléans, in December 1713). The area of the apse, enclosed by the turrets and grandly decorated on the external walls, is part of the original 12th-century building, while the more modern part of the church is the left side, which has an early 16th-century portal by Antonello Gagini. The South-Western façade, looking at the Archbishop Palace, dates from the 14th to 15th centuries.

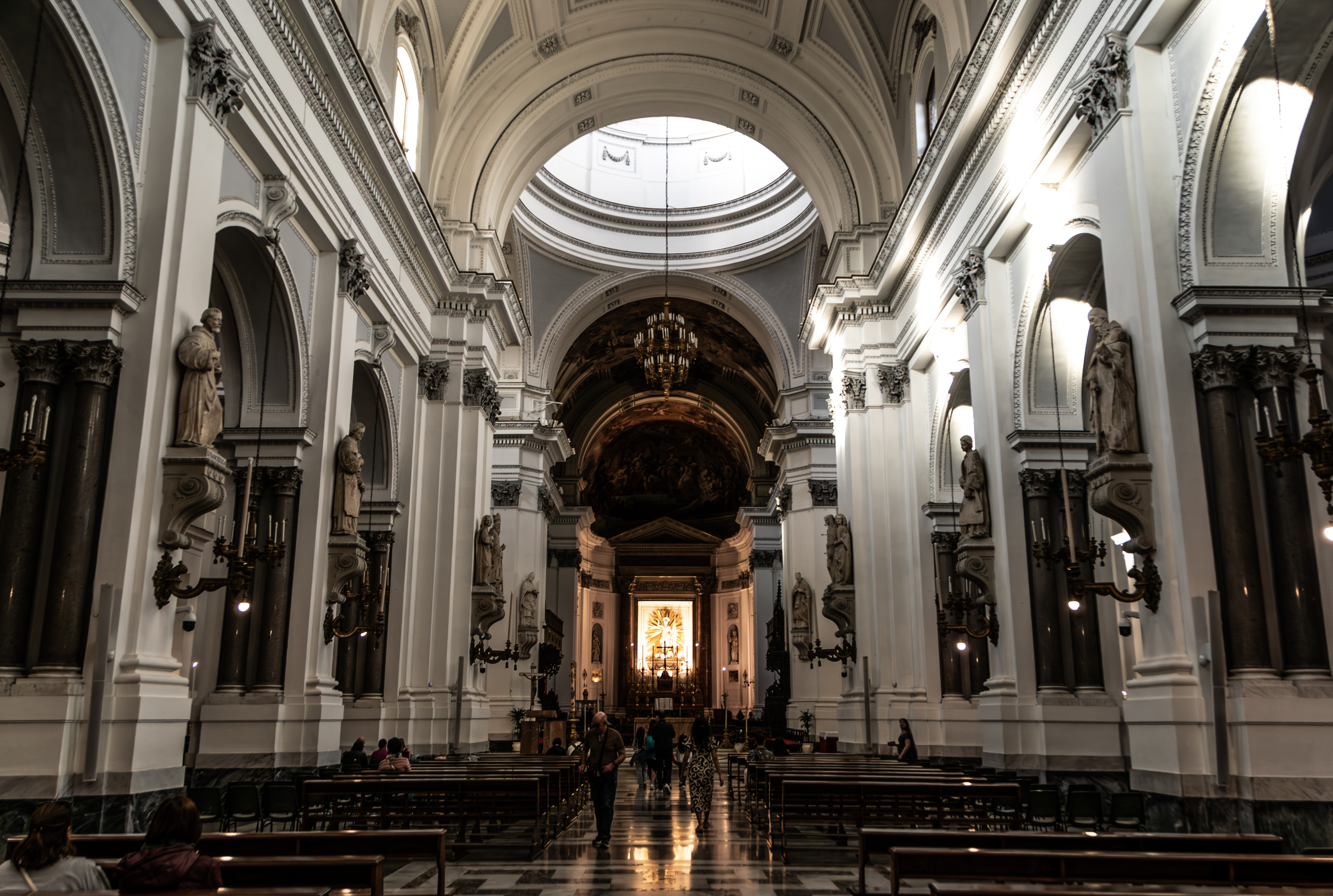
Nave of the Palermo Cathedral

The interior has a Latin cross plan, with a nave and two aisles divided by pilasters. In the first two chapels of the right aisle are the tomb of emperors and royal figures moved here in the 18th century from their original sites (mostly from the basilica itself). Here are the remains of Emperor Henry VI, his son Frederick II, as well as those of Peter II of Sicily. A Roman sarcophagus is the tomb of Constance of Aragon, Frederick's wife. Under the mosaic baldachins are the tombs of Roger II, the first King of Sicily, and his daughter Constance. The last two were once located in the transept of the Cathedral of Cefalù.

The Sacrament chapel, at the end of the left aisles, is decorated with precious stones and lapislazuli. To the right, in the presbytery, is the chapel of Saint Rosalia, patron of Palermo, closed by a richly ornamental bronze gate, with relics and a 17th-century silver urn which is object of particular devotion.

The 1466 Gothic-Catalan style wooden choir and the marble remains of the Gagini's retable (removed during the 18th-century alterations) are also precious, as well as a marble statue of the Madonna with Child by Francesco Laurana and pupils (1469), a 13th-century polychrome Crucifix by Manfredi Chiaramonte, the holy water stoup on the fourth pilaster (by Domenico Gagini) and the Madonna della Scala by Antonello Gagini, on the high altar of the new sacristy. The Relics Chapel contains the relics of St. Christina, St. Ninfa, St. Cosma, St. Agatha and St. Mamilianus, first patron of Palermo.

The crypt, accessed from the left side, is an evocative room with cross vault supported by granite columns, housing tombs and sarcophagi of Roman, Byzantine and Norman ages. People buried here include archbishops Walter Ophamil, the church's founder, and Giovanni Paternò, patron of Antonello Gagini who sculpted the image on his tomb.

The Cathedral Treasury contains goblets, vestments, monstrances, a 14th-century breviary and the famous Crown of Constance of Sicily, a golden tiara found in her tomb in 1491.

The cathedral has a meridian, which may be considered as an earlier type of heliometer (solar "observatory"), one of a number constructed in Italian churches, mainly in the 17th and 18th centuries. This one was built in 1801 by the famous astronomer Giuseppe Piazzi, the director of the Observatory of Palermo who discovered the first minor planet or asteroid, Ceres. The device itself is quite simple: a tiny hole in one of the minor domes acts as pinhole camera, projecting an image of the sun onto the floor ). There is a bronze line, la meridiana on the floor, running precisely N/S. At solar noon (circa 12:00 in winter, 13:00 in summer), the sun image passes through this line. At different times of the year the passage occurs at different point of the line. The ends of the line mark the positions at the summer and winter solstices; signs of the zodiac show various dates throughout the year.

The purpose of the instrument was to standardise the measurement of time and the calendar. The convention in Sicily had been that the (24-hour) day was measured from the moment of sun-rise, which of course meant that no two locations had the same time and, more importantly, did not have the same time as in St. Peter's Basilica in Rome. It was also important to know when the Vernal equinox occurred, to provide the correct date for Easter. On the belltowers there were six medieval bells.

The instrument could be used for research on the apparent movements of the Sun, including its relative distance from the Earth, measured through the size of the floor projected solar disk, and even to compare the results with Ptolemaic and Copernician predictions.

== 18th and 19th century renovations ==
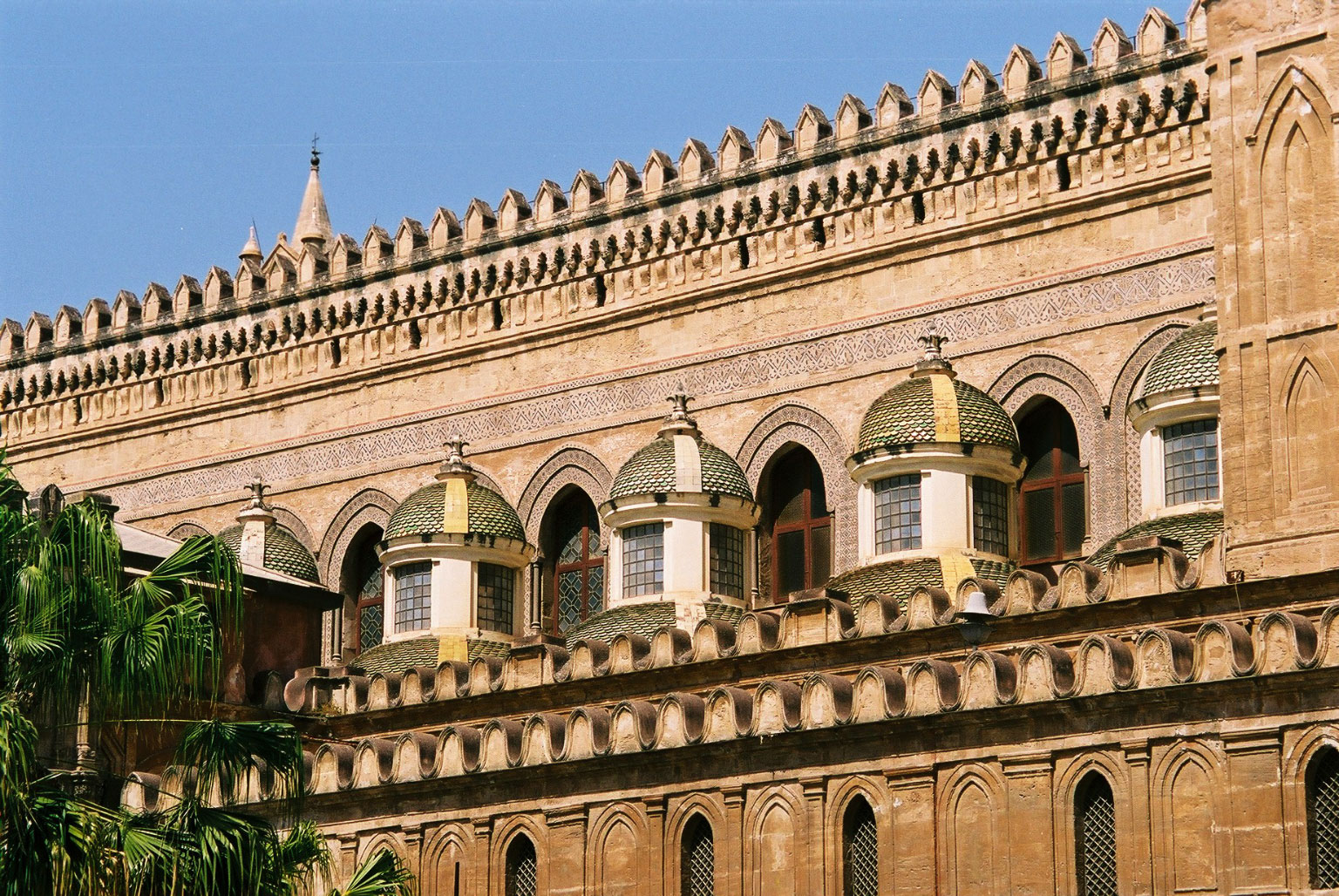
The Baroque small side cupolas by Ferdinando Fuga

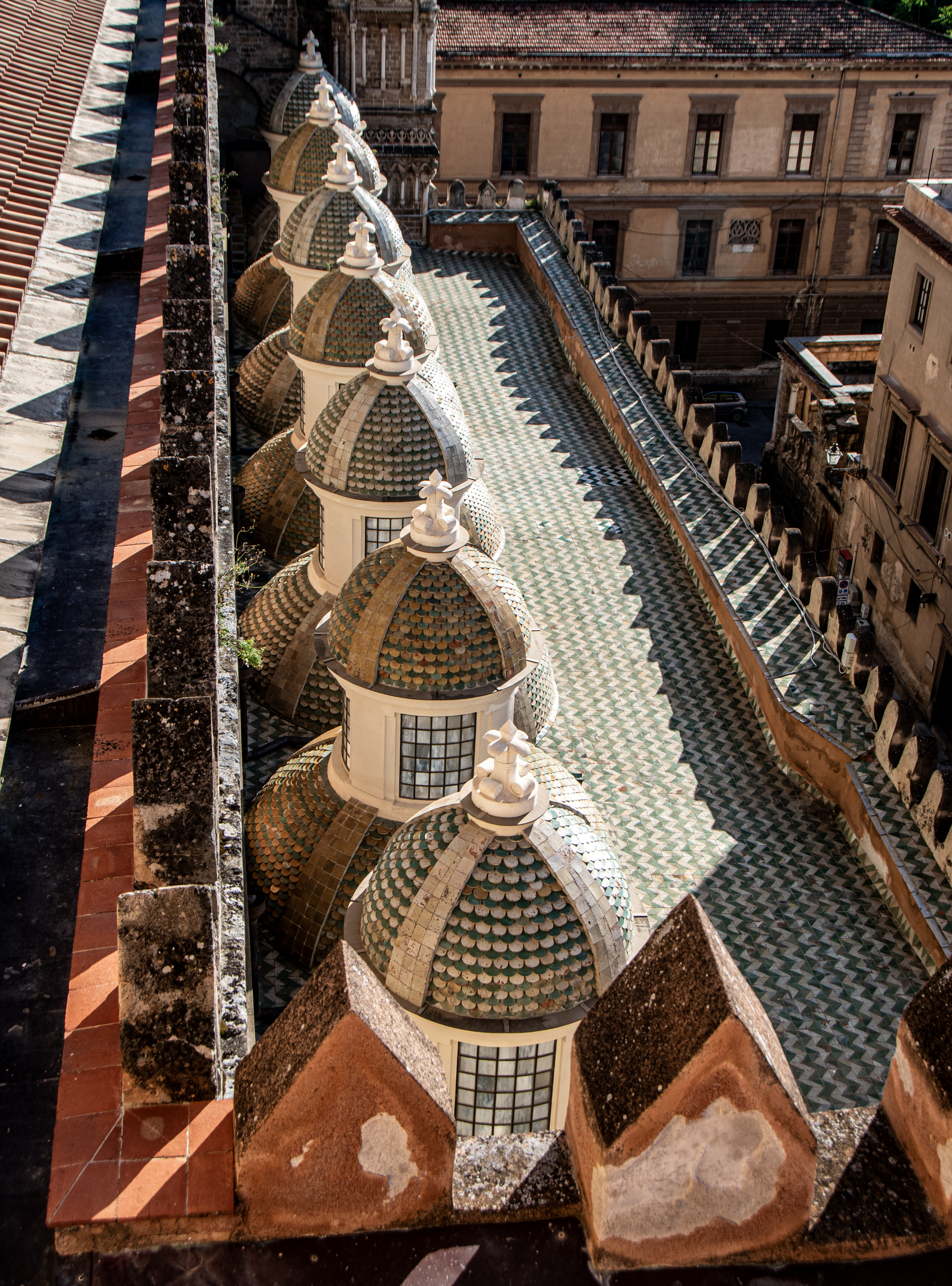
Cupolas as viewed from above

The church is composed of different styles, as in the following centuries it underwent various changes. The last was at the end of the 18th century, when it radically remade the interior designed by Ferdinando Fuga.

In 1767, the archbishop Filangieri had entrusted to Ferdinand the restoration of the building. The work began only in 1781, carried out not by Ferdinand but by Palermitan Giuseppe Venanzio Marvuglia and lasted until the 19th century.

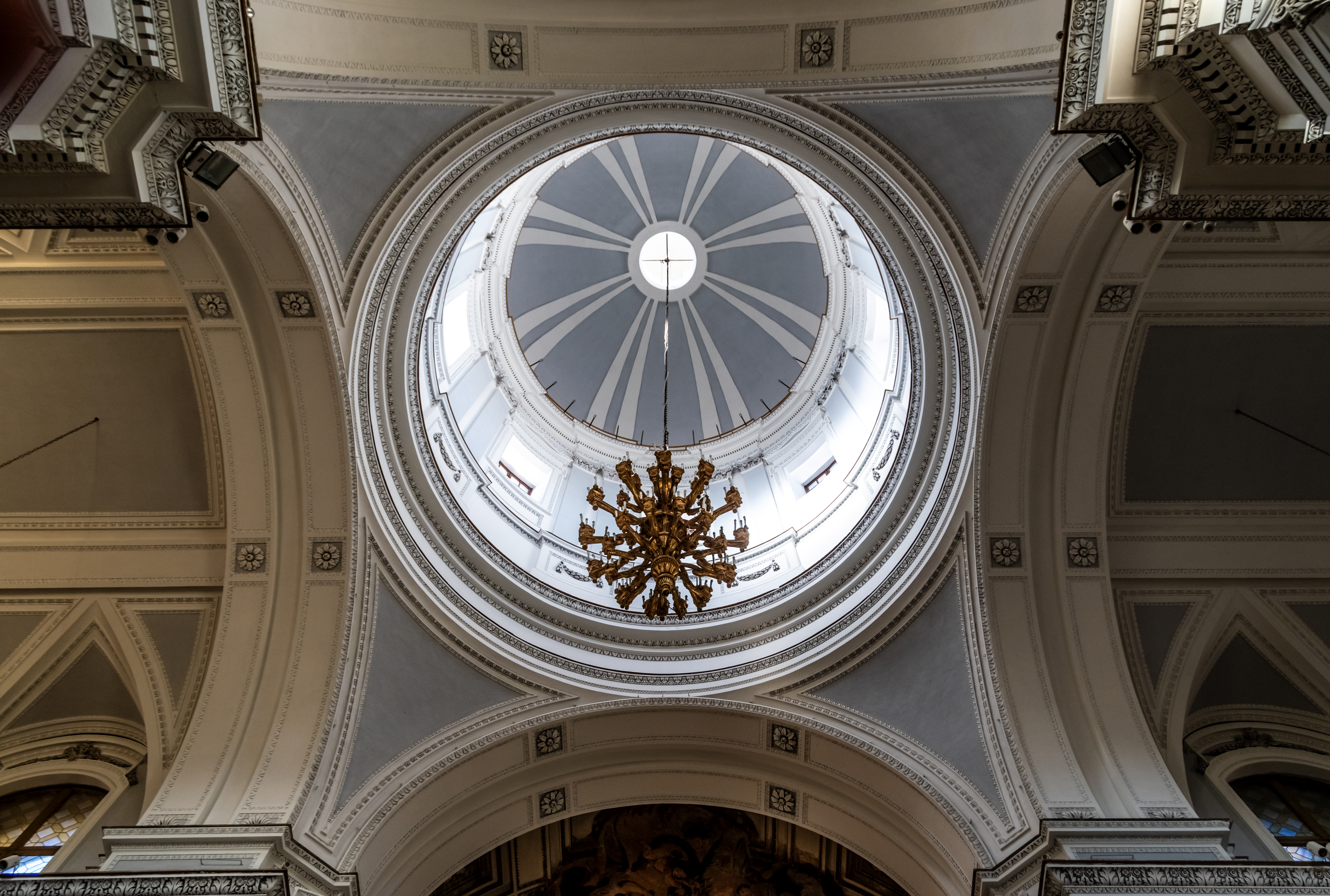
Interior of the dome

The reworkings by Marvuglia were in reality much more invasive and radical than the projects of the Florentine architect, who thought instead of keeping, at least in part, the complex of longitudinal aisles and the original wooden ceiling. The restoration intervened to change the original appearance of the complex, providing the church of the characteristic but discordant dome, performed according to the designs of Ferdinando Fuga.

A second font was added in 1797, by Fillipo and Gaetano Pennino. It is supported by sculptures depicting the Tree of Knowledge and Adam and Eve. A painting of this font by William Leighton Leitch is the subject of a poetical illustration by Letitia Elizabeth Landon, which was published posthumously in 1840.

== Royal and Imperial burials ==
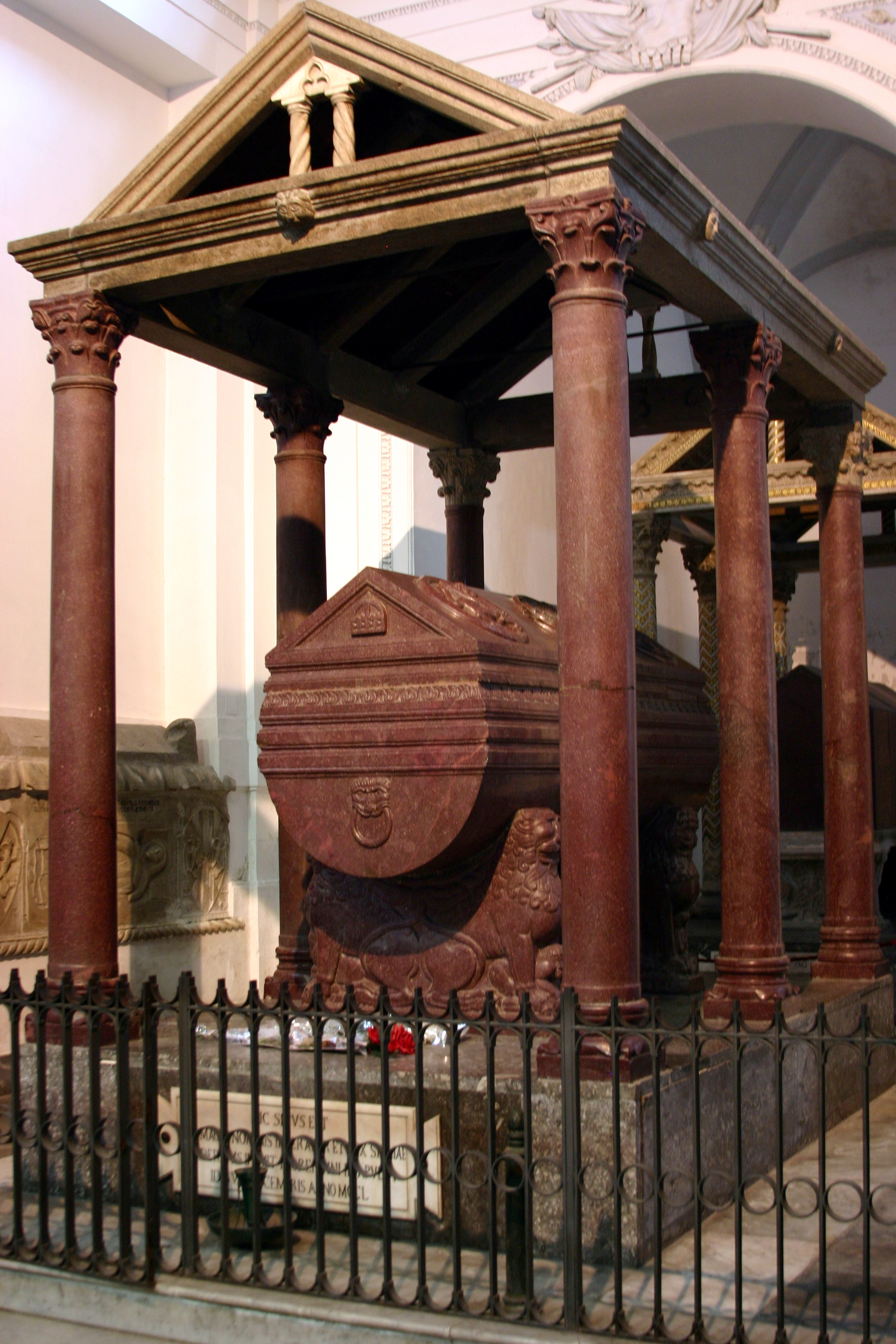
Sarcophagus of Emperor Frederick II

In the right aisle, in the first and second chapel communicating with one another, are the monumental tombs of King Roger II, his daughter Queen Constance I of Sicily, her husband Emperor Henry VI, and their son Emperor Frederick II, as well as the burials of Frederick's first wife Constance of Aragon and his great-great-grandson William II, Duke of Athens on the side walls. The four main sarcophagi, all in porphyry, form a group that also includes that of William I of Sicily in Monreale Cathedral. They "are the very first examples of medieval free-standing secular tombs in the West, and therefore play a unique role within the history of Italian sepulchral art (earlier and later tombs are adjacent to, and dependent on walls)." It is likely that the four sarcophagi of William I (in Monreale), Constance, Henry and Frederick were carved by a local Sicilian workshop from a single Roman column shaft, possibly from the Baths of Caracalla or the Baths of Diocletian in Rome. They ostensibly took inspiration from the porphyry sarcophagi of late Roman Emperors that were still visible in the 12th century in the Church of the Holy Apostles in Constantinople, including those of Constantine the Great and his successors up to Marcian as described by Constantine VII Porphyrogenitus in the De Ceremoniis, four of which now stand in front of the İstanbul Archaeology Museums' main building.

The sarcophagus of Frederick II is surmounted by a canopy with porphyry columns and the urn is supported by two pairs of lions, together with those of Frederick II were also preserved the remains of Peter II of Sicily.

Odo of Bayeux, half-brother of William the Conqueror, was buried in the cathedral in 1097. Aside from burials, Vittorio Amedeo II of Savoy and Charles III of Spain were crowned in the cathedral.

== The treasure of the cathedral ==
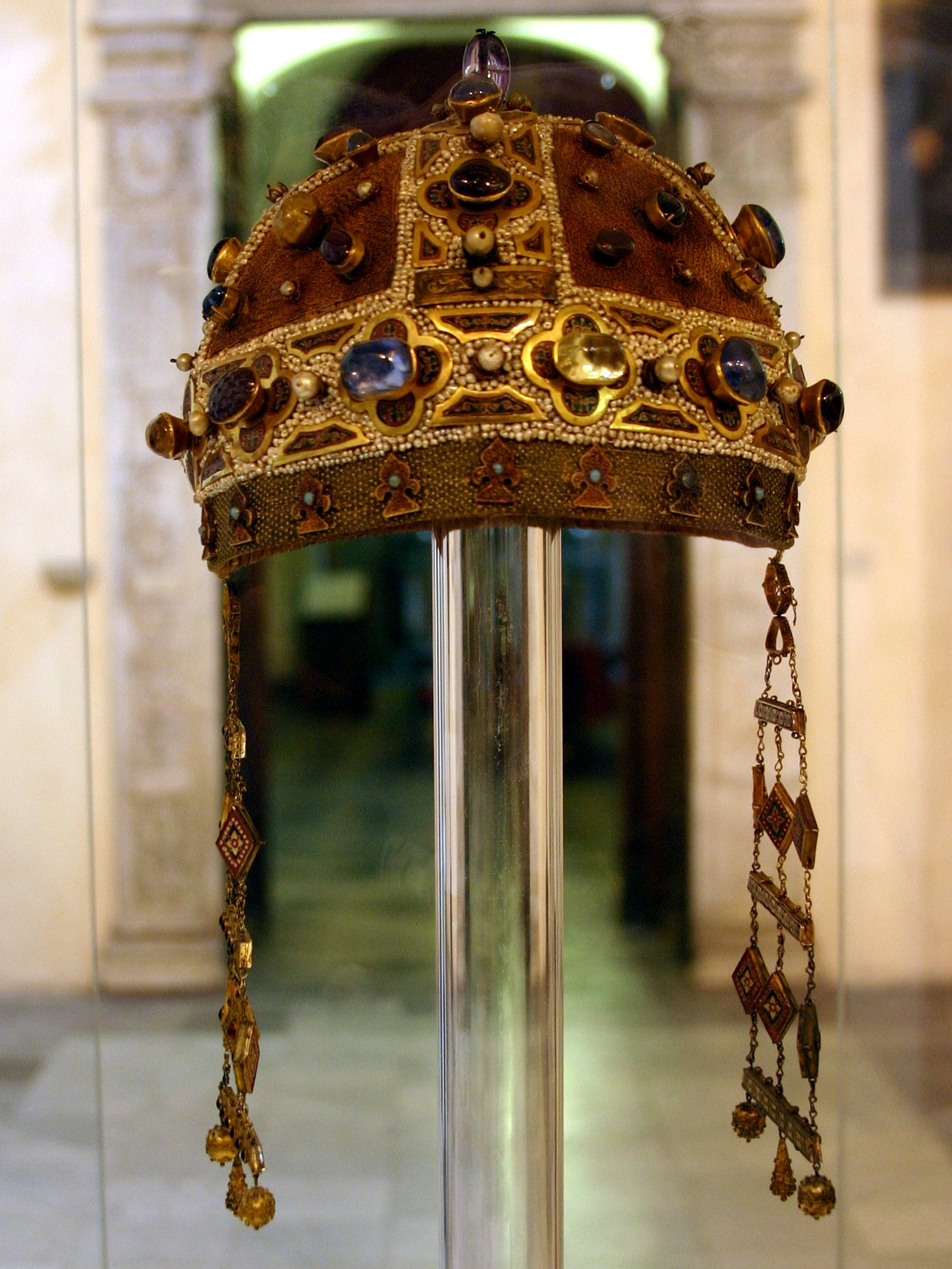
Crown of Empress Constance, Consort of Emperor Frederick II

The treasure of the cathedral, which is composed of sacred vestments from the 16th and 18th centuries, frontals, monstrances, chalices, a breviary with miniatures of the 15th century and the gold crown of Constance of Aragon. Other precious objects, enamels, embroidery and jewelry, are exposed in central message boards such as for example the breviary parchment of the 1452 coat of arms with an Archbishop Simon from Bologna. The system of bells currently mounted is composed of eight elements assembled with the Ambrosian.

== Gallery ==
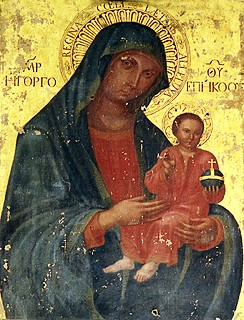
Vergine col Bambino inside the cathedral by Antonio Filocamo.

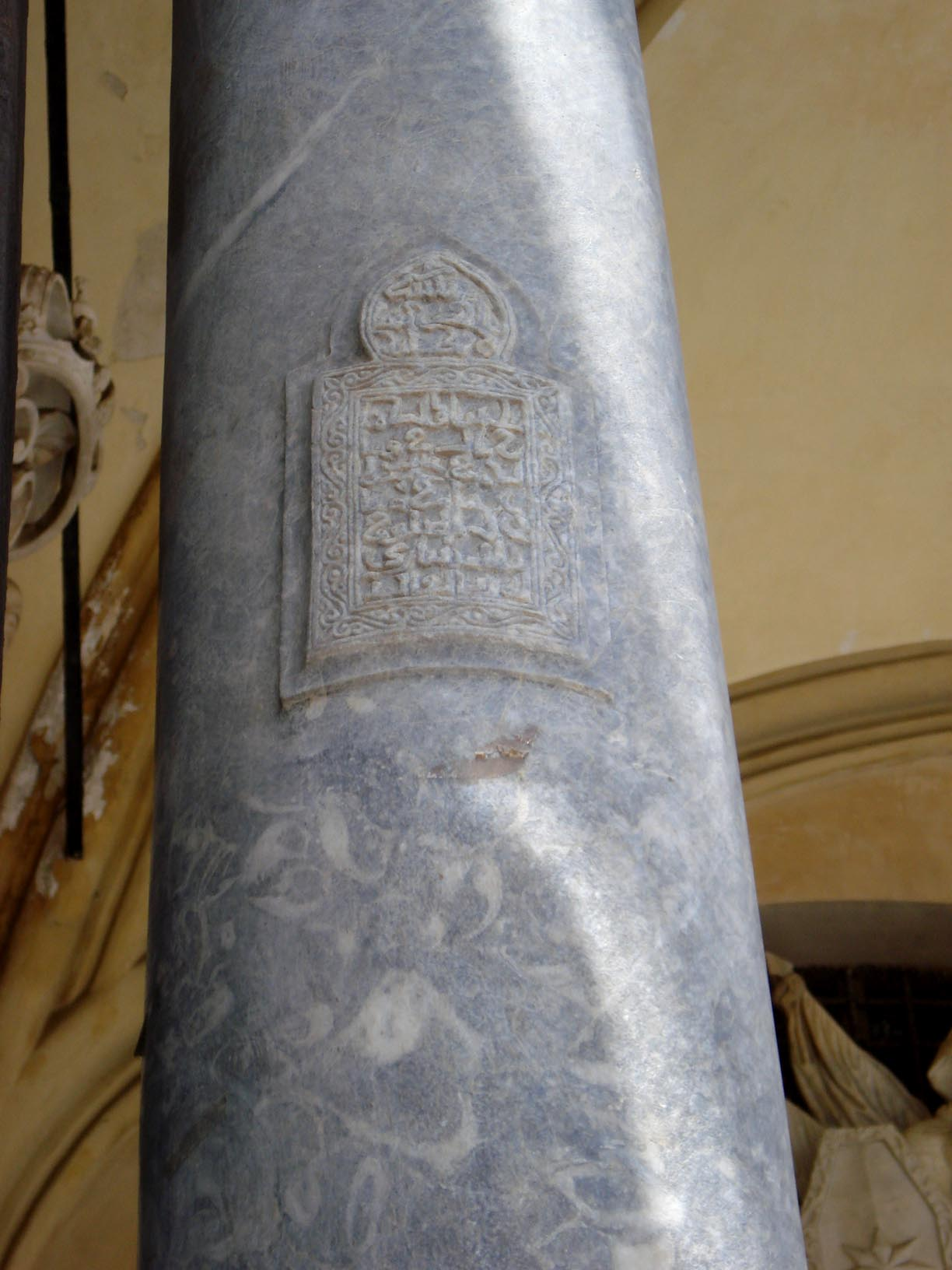
Arabic inscription on the far left column of the cathedral's entrance (verse 54:Al-A'raf)

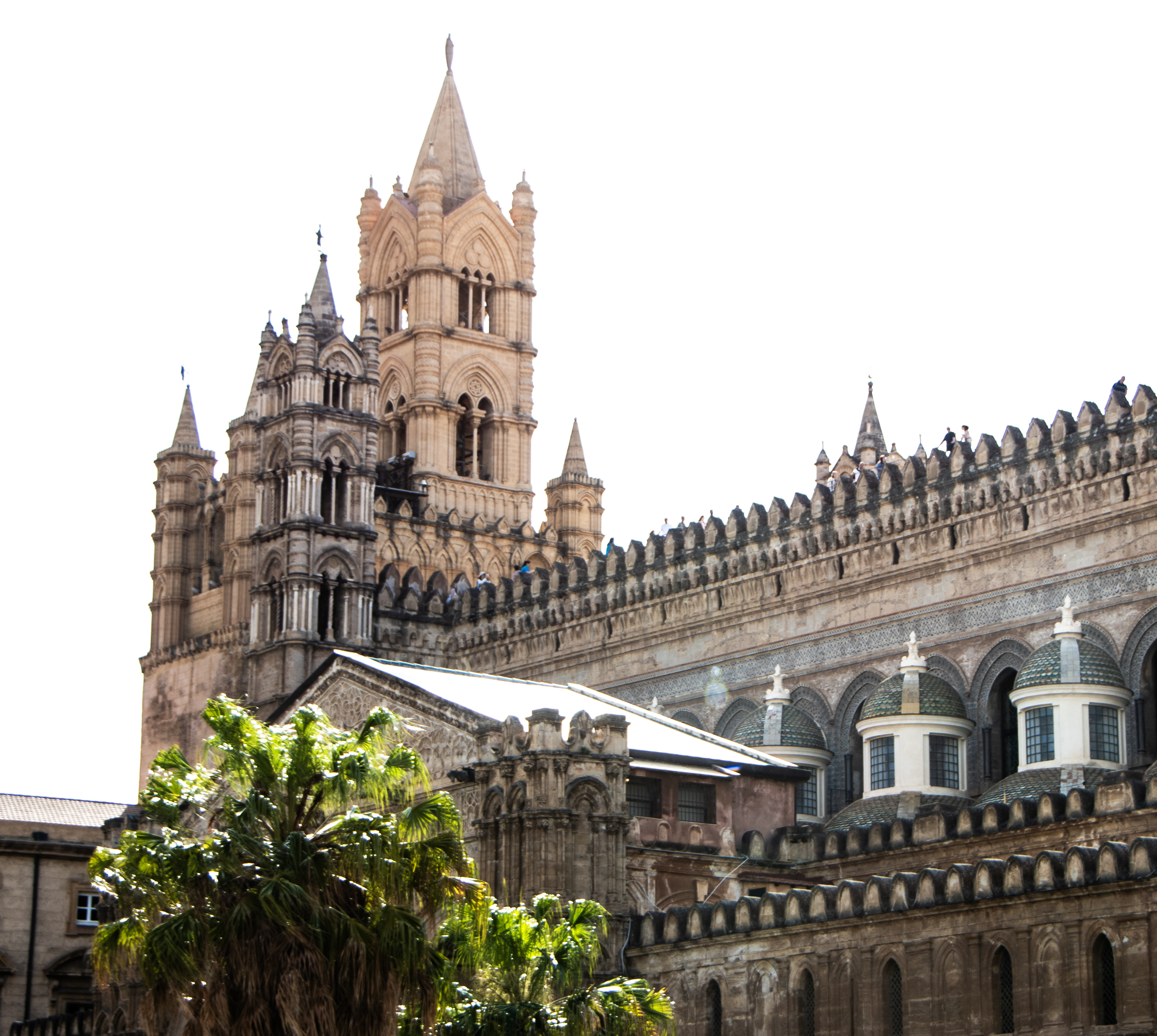
Cupolas with western towers in the background.

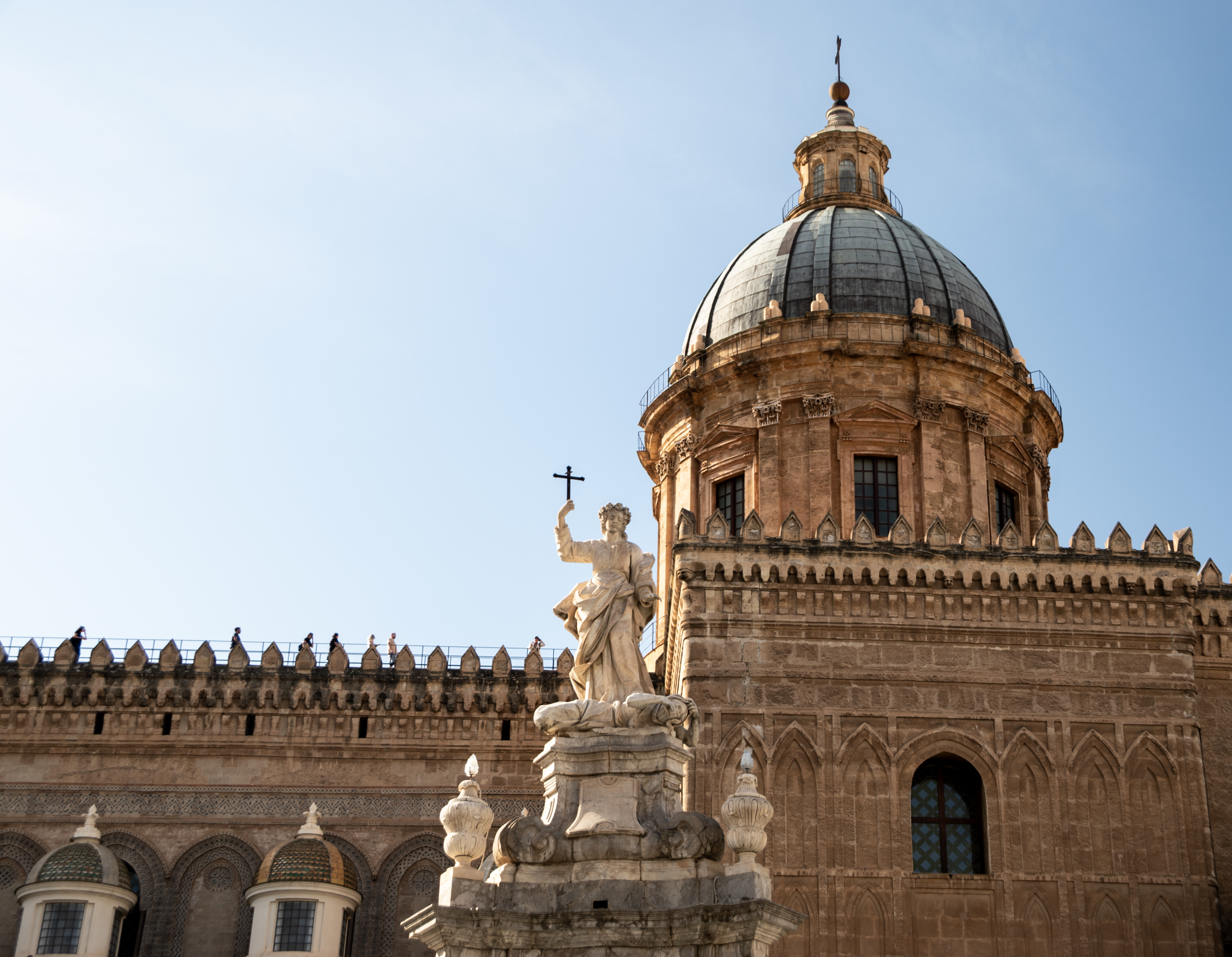
Statue of Saint Rosalia (by Vincenzo Vitaliano) in front of the dome.

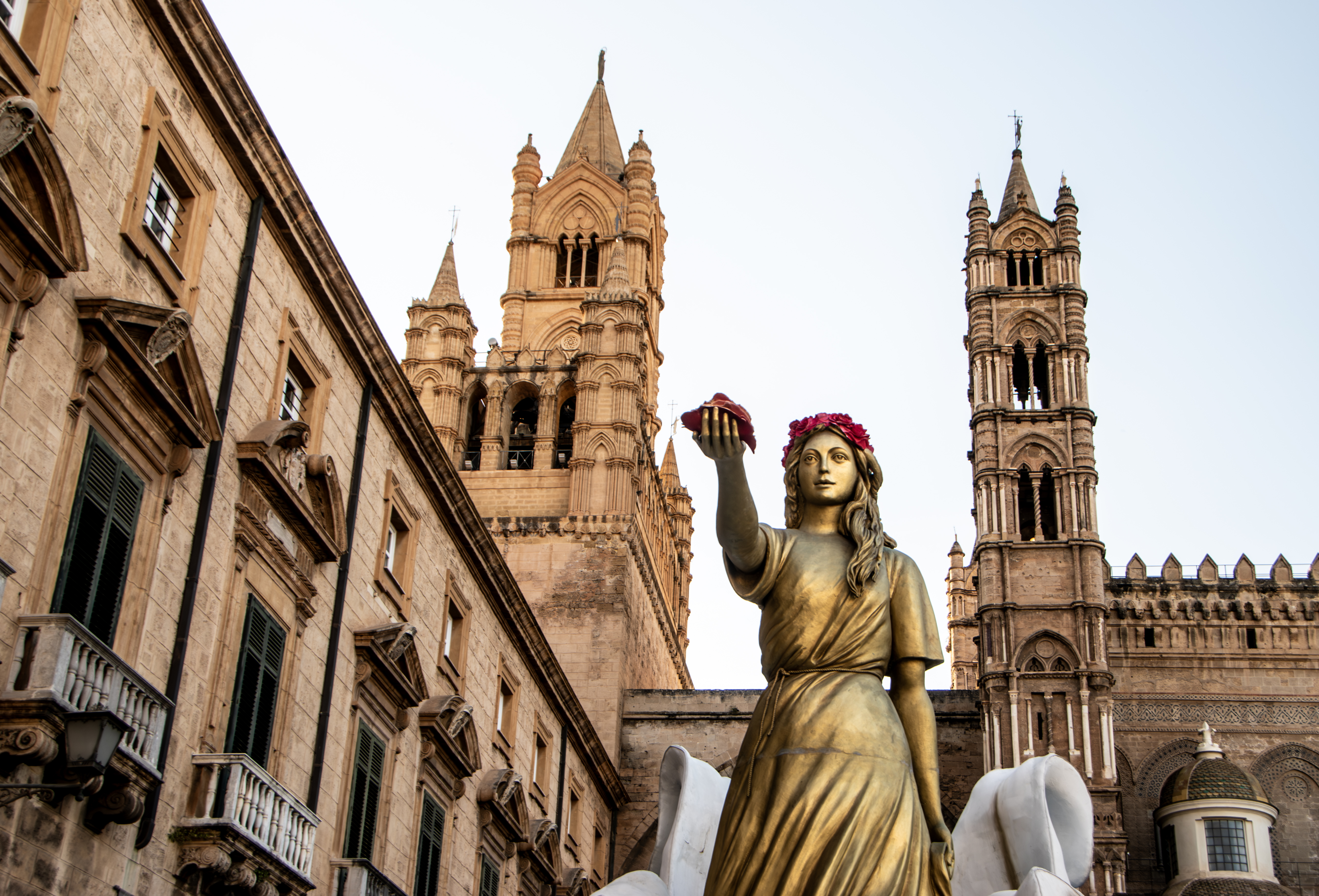
Float of Saint Rosalia, the Archbishops' Palace (left), and the Cathedral (right)

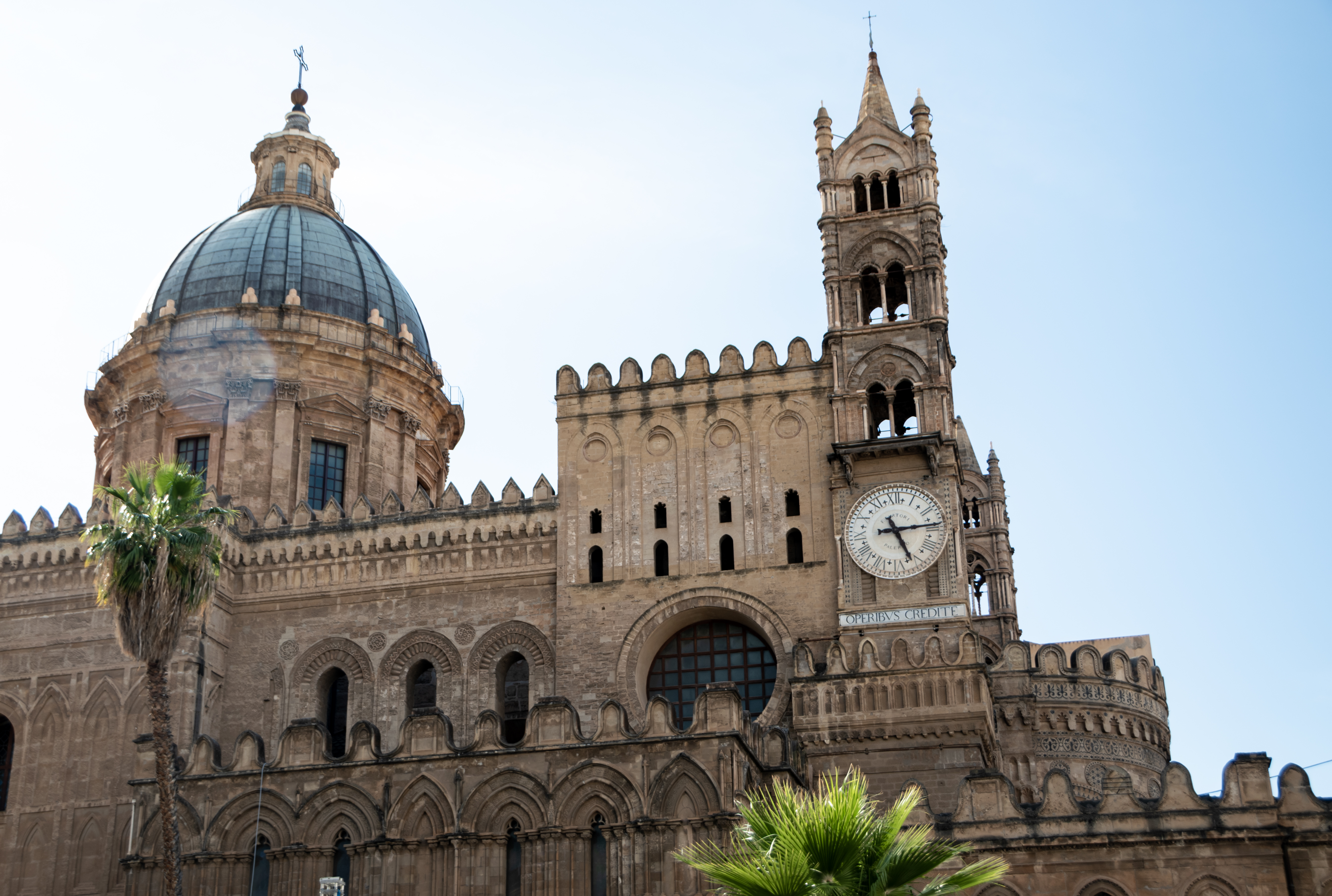
Image with clocktower visible.

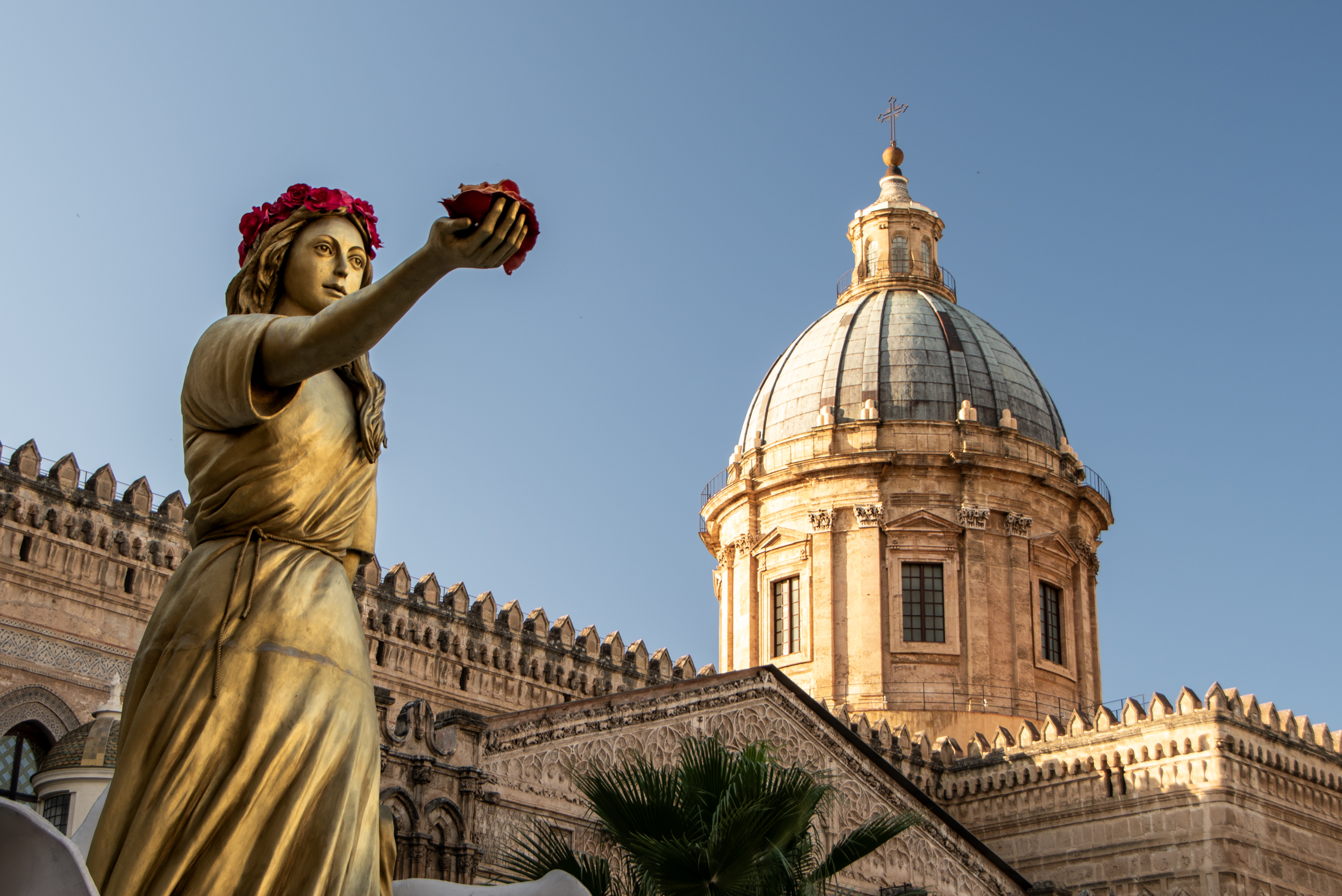
Float of Saint Rosalia pictured in front of the dome.

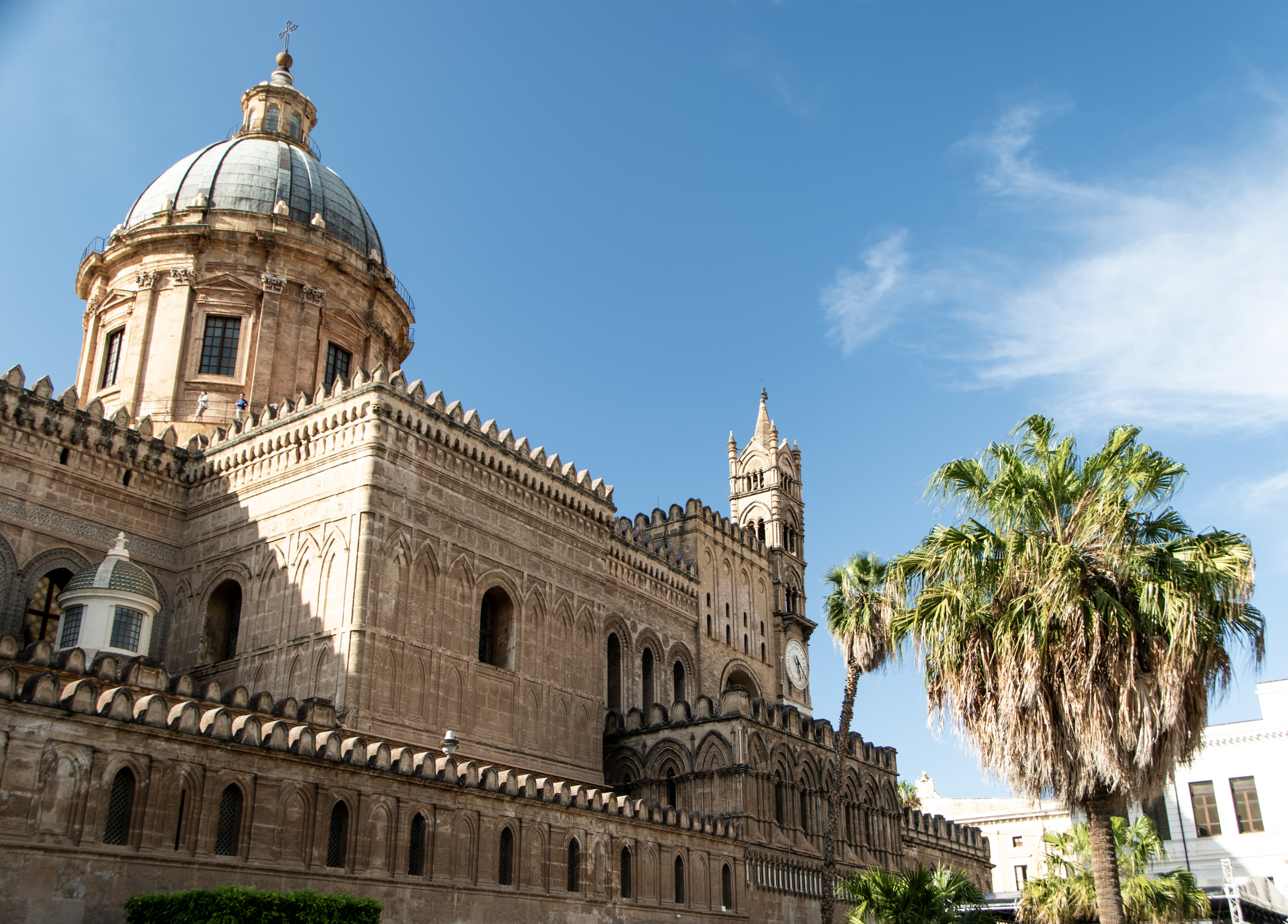
Cathedral façade viewed at an angle.

== See also ==
- Arab-Norman Palermo and the Cathedral Churches of Cefalù and Monreale

== Sources ==
- Palermo, in Enciclopedia universale, Rizzoli, Milano 1990.
- Patrizia Fabbri, Palermo e Monreale, Bonechi, 2005.
- Sicily and Its Islands, 1993 - Ugo La Rosa Publisher
- Angiola Maria Romanini; Antonio Cadei (1994). L'architettura medievale in Sicilia: la cattedrale di Palermo (in Italian). Roma: Istituto della Enciclopedia italiana.
