= Gioacchino Martorana =

Sicilian painter (1736–1779)

- Born: 19 August 1736; Palermo, Sicily, Italy
- Died: 27 November 1779 (aged 43); Palermo

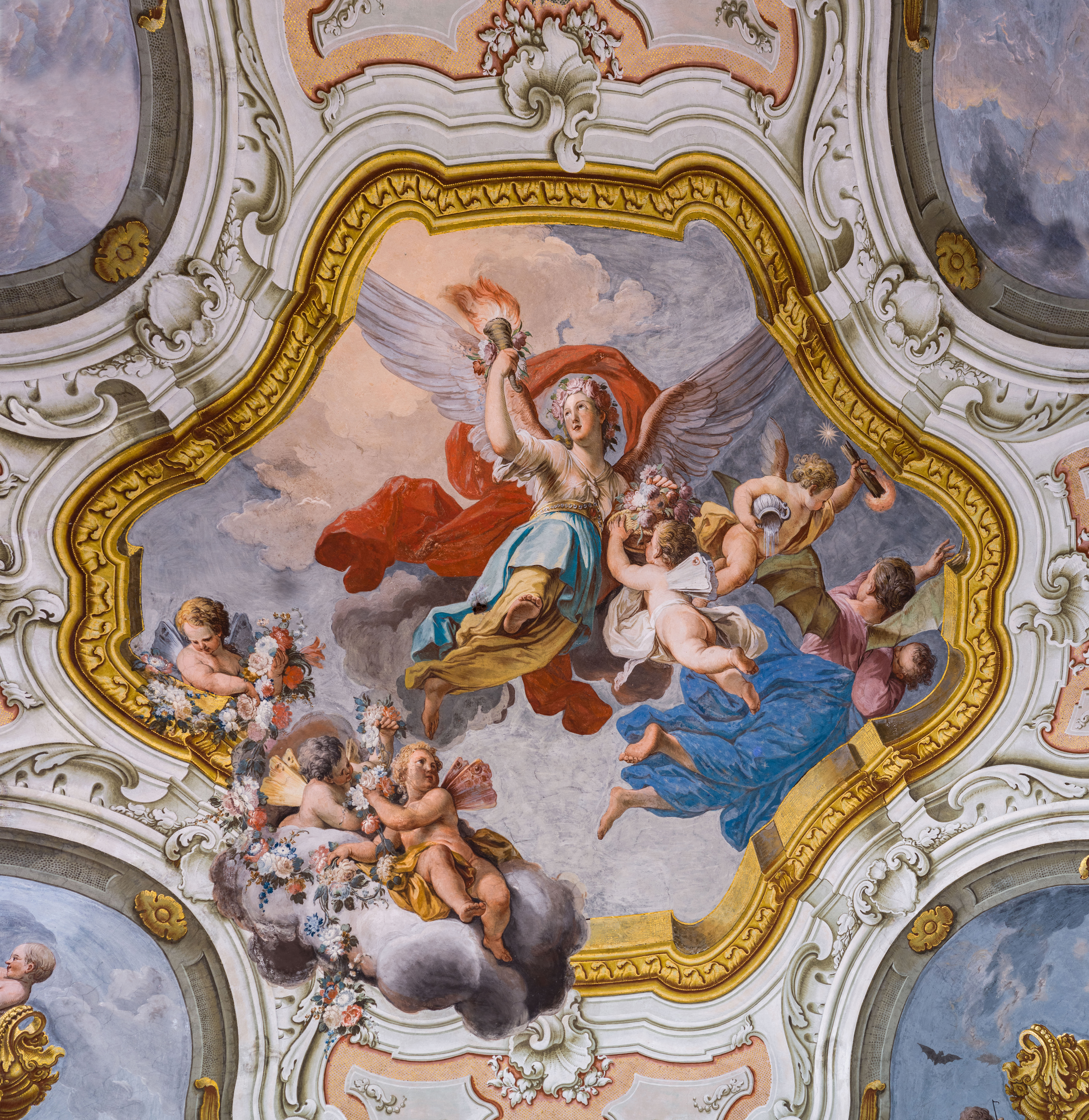
Fresco in the Palazzo Butera

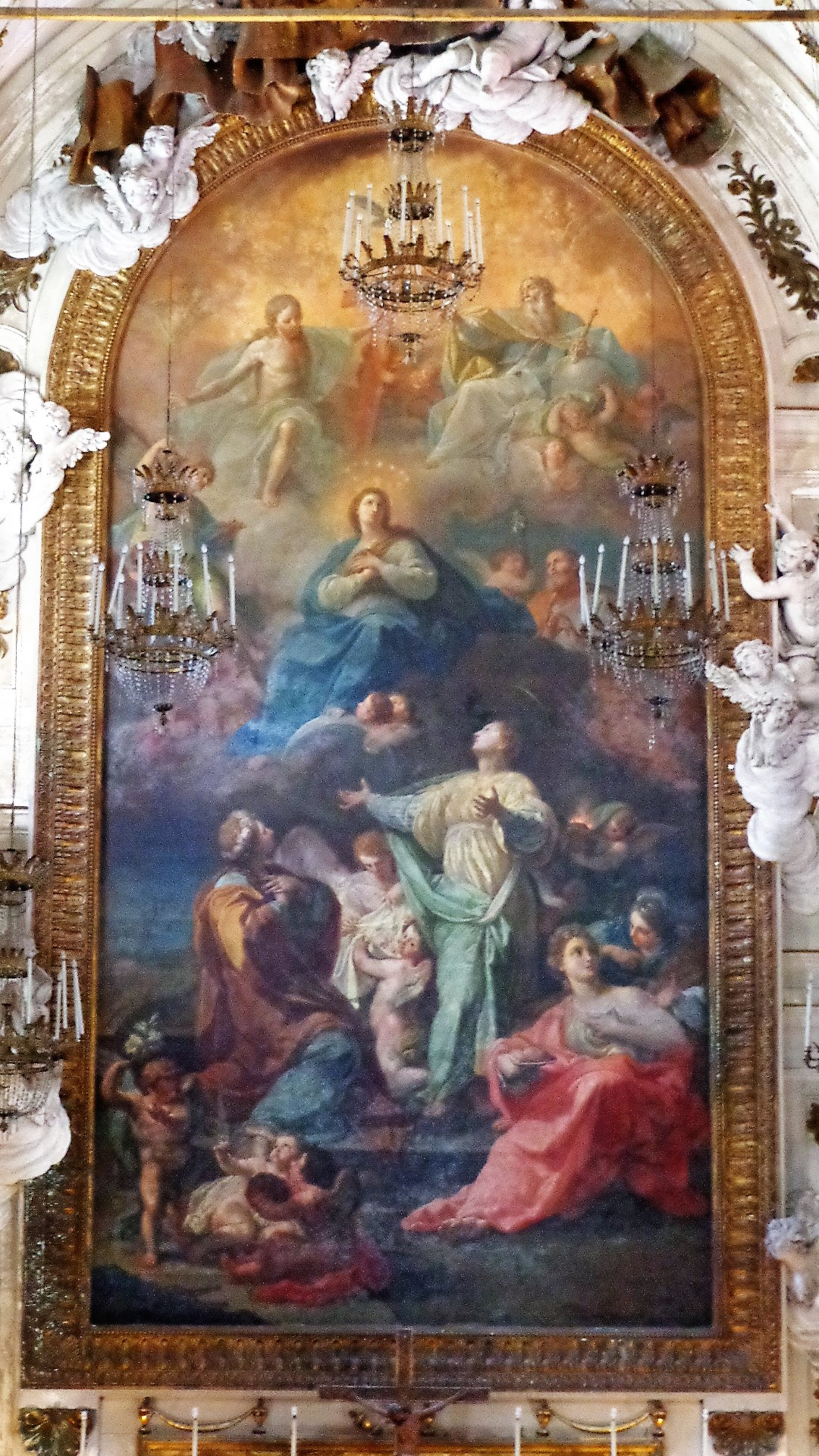
Altarpiece, Santa Ninfa dei Crociferi, Palermo

Gioacchino Martorana (19 August 1736 – 27 November 1779) was a Sicilian painter. He was the son of Pietro Martorana, brother-in-law of Gaspare Fumagalli, and a member of an extended family of decorators and artists from Palermo.

Martorana was born in Palermo, in the Mediterranean island of Sicily. When he was seventeen he went to Rome to study under his father's former pupil Giuseppe Vasi, and also spent time with Marco Benefial. He remained in Rome until the 1770s. He painted many religious subjects; much of his work shows the influence of Sebastiano Conca and of Pompeo Girolamo Batoni. After his return to Palermo he painted a number of portraits, including one of the Sicilian architect Giuseppe Venanzio Marvuglia. He painted frescoes in several palaces of the city, among them Palazzo Comitini, Palazzo Costantino and Palazzo Butera. These late works show the influence of the French Rococo style introduced to Palermo by Elia Interguglielmi.

Martorana died in Palermo on 27 November 1779.
