= Gaspare Fumagalli =

Italian Painter (c.1722–1778)

- Born: c. 1722; Rome, Italy
- Died: 18 April 1778 (aged 56); Palermo, Sicily
- Spouse: Rosaria Martorana

Gaspare Fumagalli (c. 1722–18 April 1778), was an Italian painter born in Rome, mostly active in Palermo during the 18th century. He was the son-in-law of Pietro Martorana, and brother-in-law of Gioacchino Martorana, and a member of an extended family of Sicilian painters.

== Biography ==
Little is known about Gaspare Fumagalli's early life. He was born in Rome during the early eighteenth century and is believed to have received his training there before moving to Sicily before 1744. By the mid-eighteenth century he was active in Palermo, where he established himself as a painter of frescoes, decorative schemes, landscapes, vedute, still lifes and genre scenes. He frequently collaborated with Vito D’Anna and is also believed to have worked with Guglielmo Borremans on decorative commissions. Among his earliest documented works are the decorations for the feast of San Giacomo in Caltagirone (1749) and the architectural decorations of the Church of San Sebastiano in Palermo, executed with Gaspare Giottino and Giuseppe Cavarretta. During the same period he painted the ceiling fresco of the Church of Santa Chiara in Palermo, which was destroyed during the Allied bombing of the city in 1943. Throughout his career he undertook commissions for churches, palaces and aristocratic residences across Sicily, including work at Villa Resuttano Pitroales, Palazzo Valguarnera in Gangi, the Oratory of the Bianchi, Villa Pantelleria and Palazzo Bongiorno.

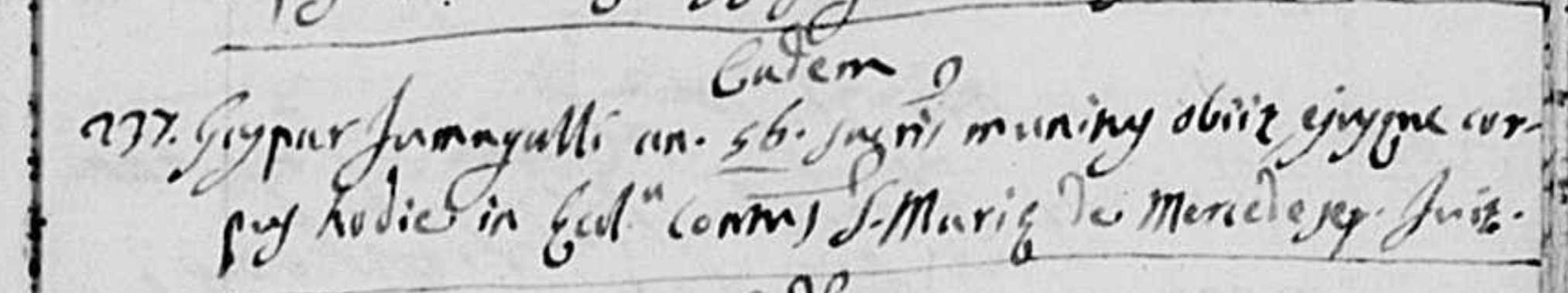
Death certificate of Gaspare Fumagalli

Fumagalli was married to Rosaria Martorana, daughter of the painter Pietro Martorana, and sister of Gioacchino Martorana. The two had children, including Eugenio, Epifanio, and Ermenegildo, all three of which became painters in Palermo. Fumagalli died in Palermo on 18 April 1778.
