= Antonio Filocamo =

Italian painter (1669–1743)

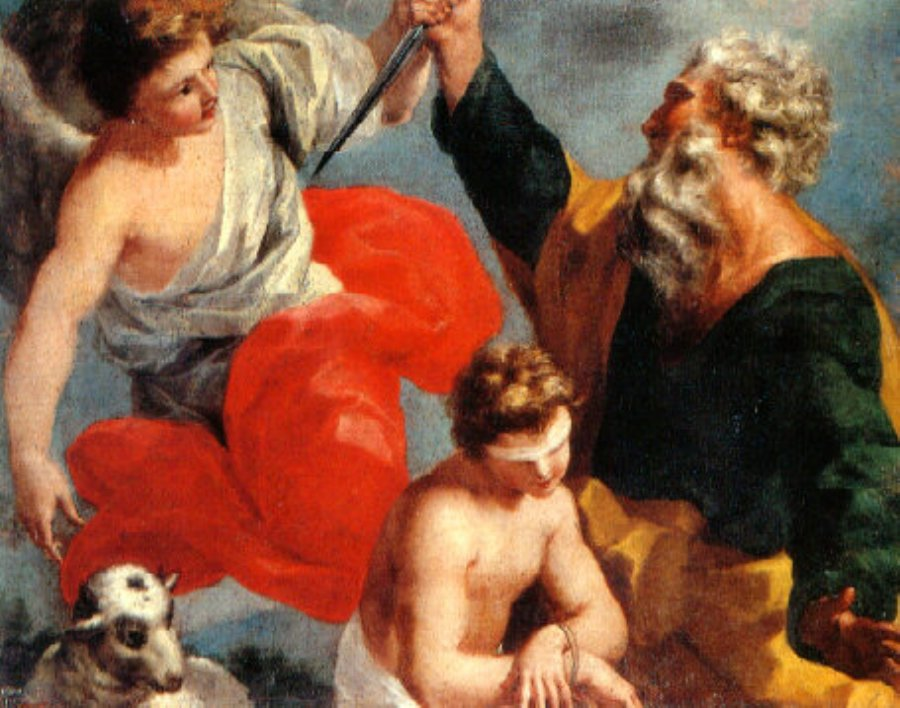
Sacrifice of Isaac located at Zelantea Library and Gallery in Acireale

Antonio Filocamo (1669–1743) and his brother Paolo were Italian painters of the Baroque period.

== Biography ==
Natives of Messina, Kingdom of Sicily, they are noticed by Hackert in his Memorie de' Pittori Messinesi. They were educated in the school of Carlo Maratta in Rome. On their return to Messina, they established an academy, which was much frequented. They executed conjointly several works, both in oil and in fresco, in the former of which Antonio was very superior to Paolo. Their principal works are in the churches of Santa Caterina di Valverde and San Gregorio, at Messina, where they both died of the plague in 1743.

In 1712 Antonio and his brother decorated the choir of the Acireale Cathedral, depicting the Ascension of the Virgin. In the Chapel of Santa Venera, they painted the Preaching and Martyrdom of Saint Venera.
