= Elia Interguglielmi =

Italian painter

- Born: 1746; Naples, Kingdom of Naples (now Italy)
- Died: 16 May 1835 (aged 88–89); Palermo, Kingdom of the Two Sicilies (now Italy)
- Education: Giuseppe Bonito; Antonio Dominici
- Known for: Painting; fresco decoration
- Notable work: Scenes from the Life of Saint Anne (1767, Sant'Anna la Misericordia, Palermo); Life of the Virgin (1782, Santa Maria degli Agonizzanti, Palermo); numerous fresco decorations in palazzi and villas in Palermo and Bagheria (c. 1780–1810); "Glory of the Virtuous Prince" (c. 1785–1790, Villa Valguarnera, Bagheria)
- Movement: Late Baroque → Neoclassicism

Elia Interguglielmi (1746 – 16 May 1835) was an Italian painter of the Neoclassical style, active in Naples and Palermo.

== Biography ==
Elia Interguglielmi was born in Naples in 1746. He initially worked under Gaspare Fumagalli in Palermo. He is documented in Naples until 1762, where he formed his style by working as a draughtsman at the Reale Opificio delle Pietre Dure and trained in the studios of Giuseppe Bonito and of Antonio Dominici, a Sicilian painter active in Naples. He then moved to Palermo, where his first paintings, of scenes from the Life of St. Anne (1767; Palermo, Sant'Anna della Misericordia), were influenced by Vito D'Anna, who had taught Dominici and who was a leading figure in the art world of 18th-century Palermo.

The scenes from the Life of the Virgin (Palermo, Chiesa degli Agonizzanti, 1782) are directly influenced by Neapolitan painting, especially that of Luca Giordano and Francesco Solimena. Between c. 1780 and 1810, Interguglielmi executed decorative frescoes in palazzi and villas in Palermo and in Piana dei Colli (Bagheria), becoming one of the leading figures in the transition from the late Baroque to Neoclassicism. Among such works are frescoes in the Palazzi Santa Croce–Sant'Elia (c. 1790), Gangi (1792), Mirto (1793) and Coglitore (1796), all in Palermo. In the frescoes in the Villa Bordonaro Adriana at Colli, also attributed to Interguglielmi, he created an illusion of deep space through the classical device of a perspective of colonnades.

Towards the end of the 18th century Interguglielmi moved his workshop to Bagheria, where the aristocracy from Palermo built their country houses. In his later years, he responded to a central European decorative style, which had already spread to Naples, in which Rococo and Neoclassical elements were harmoniously united. The fresco Glory of the Virtuous Prince (c. 1785–1790; Bagheria, Villa Valguarnera) initiated this successful period. There followed frescoes (1796–97) in the Villa Trabia, Bagheria, where the unity of the architecture is emphasized by the painted decoration, which was inspired by recent discoveries in Herculaneum and by the Pompeian style of the Adam brothers and the porcelain of Wedgwood.

== Bibliography ==
- Siracusano, C. (1986). La pittura del ’700 in Sicilia. Rome. pp. 363–6.
- Siracusano, C. (1989). "La pittura del '700 in Sicilia". In G. Briganti (ed.). La pittura in Italia: Il settecento. 2 vols. Milan. pp. 751–2.
