= San Domenico, Palermo =

Roman Catholic church in Palermo, Italy

Church of Saint Dominic
- Chiesa di San Domenico (in Italian)
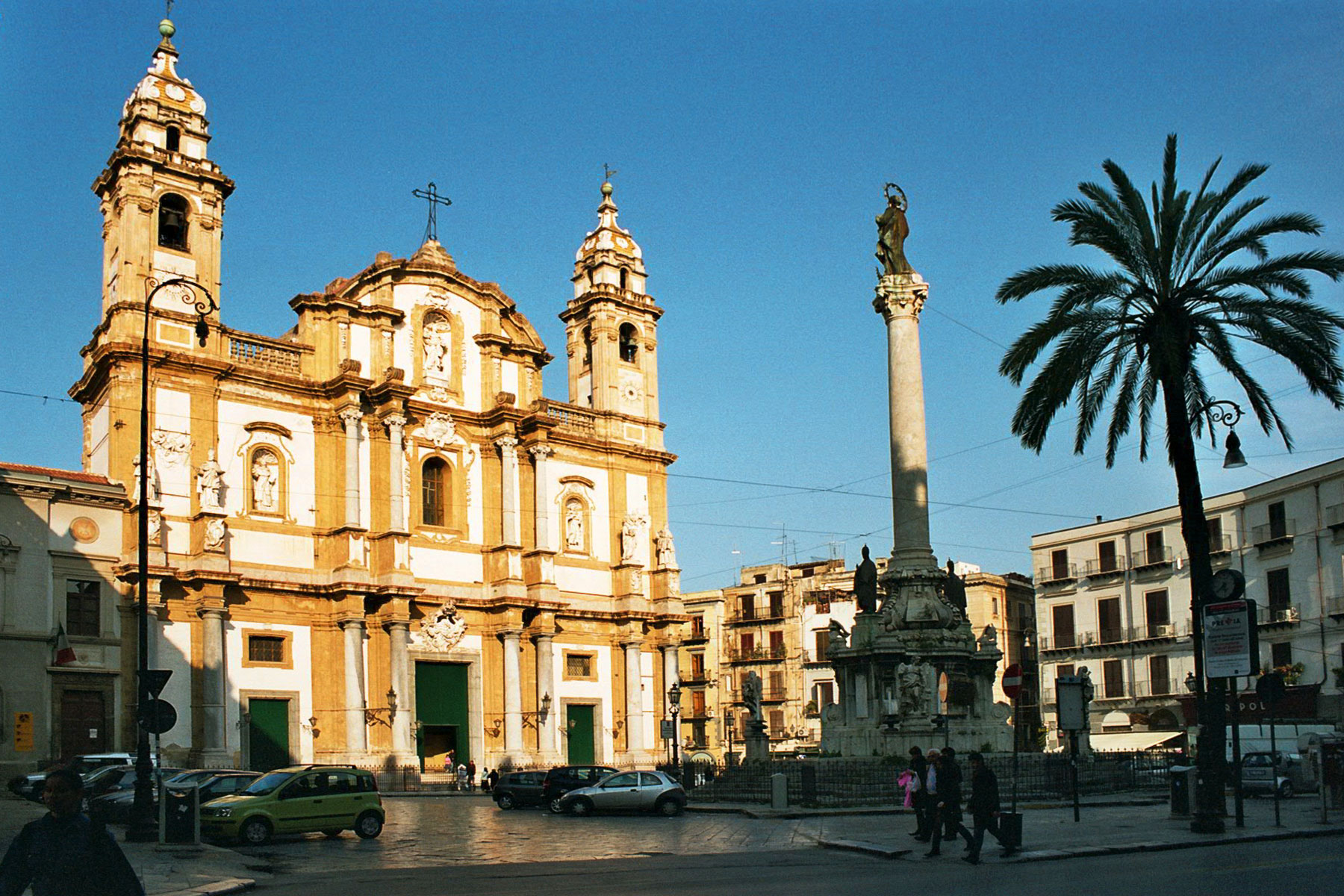
- Piazza San Domenico

Religion
- Affiliation: Roman Catholic
- Province: Archdiocese of Palermo
- Rite: Roman Rite

Location
- Location: Palermo, Italy
- Interactive map of Church of Saint Dominic
- Coordinates: 38°07′08.46″N 13°21′48.18″E

Architecture
- Style: Sicilian Baroque
- Groundbreaking: 1640
- Completed: 1770

Website
- Official site

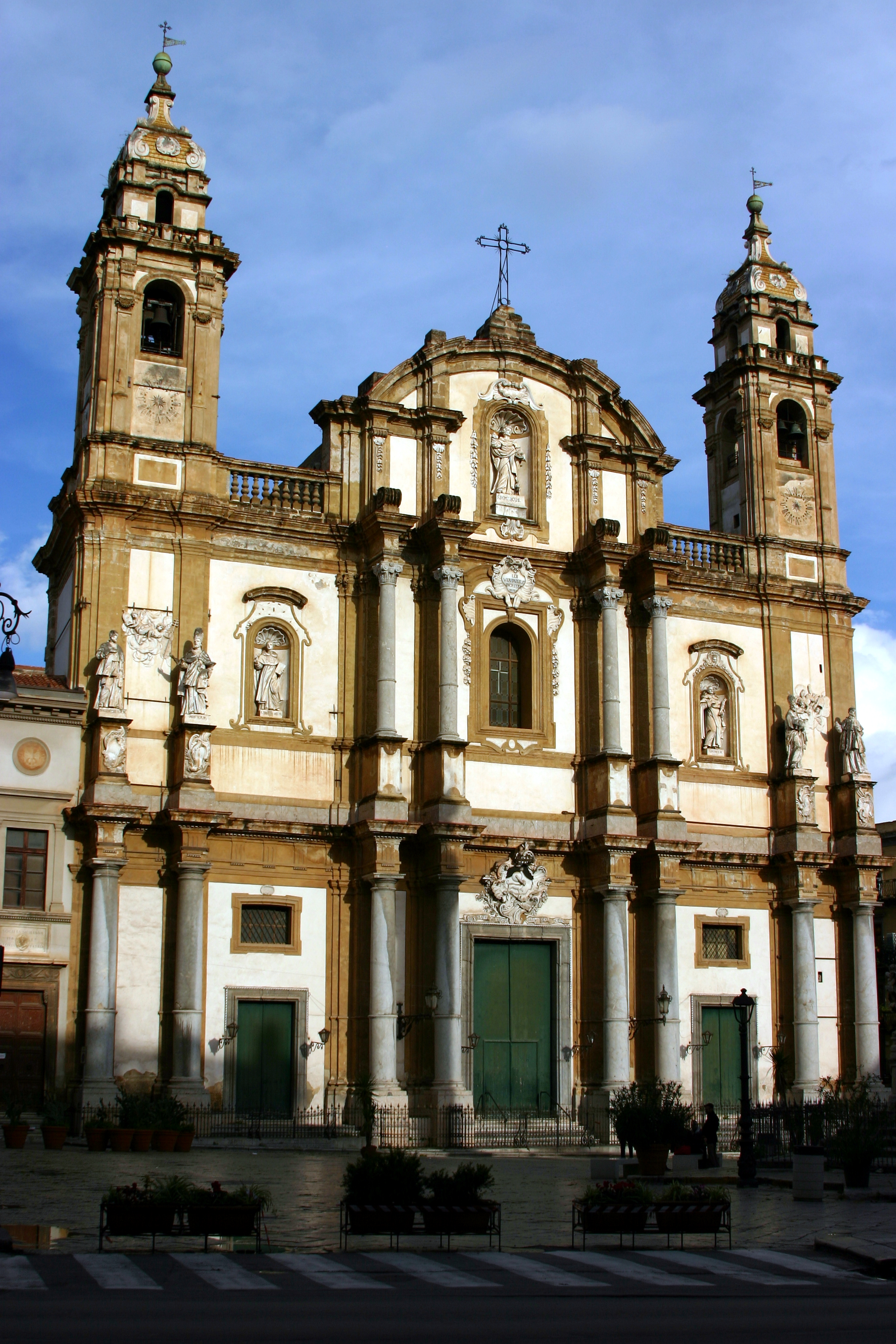
Façade.

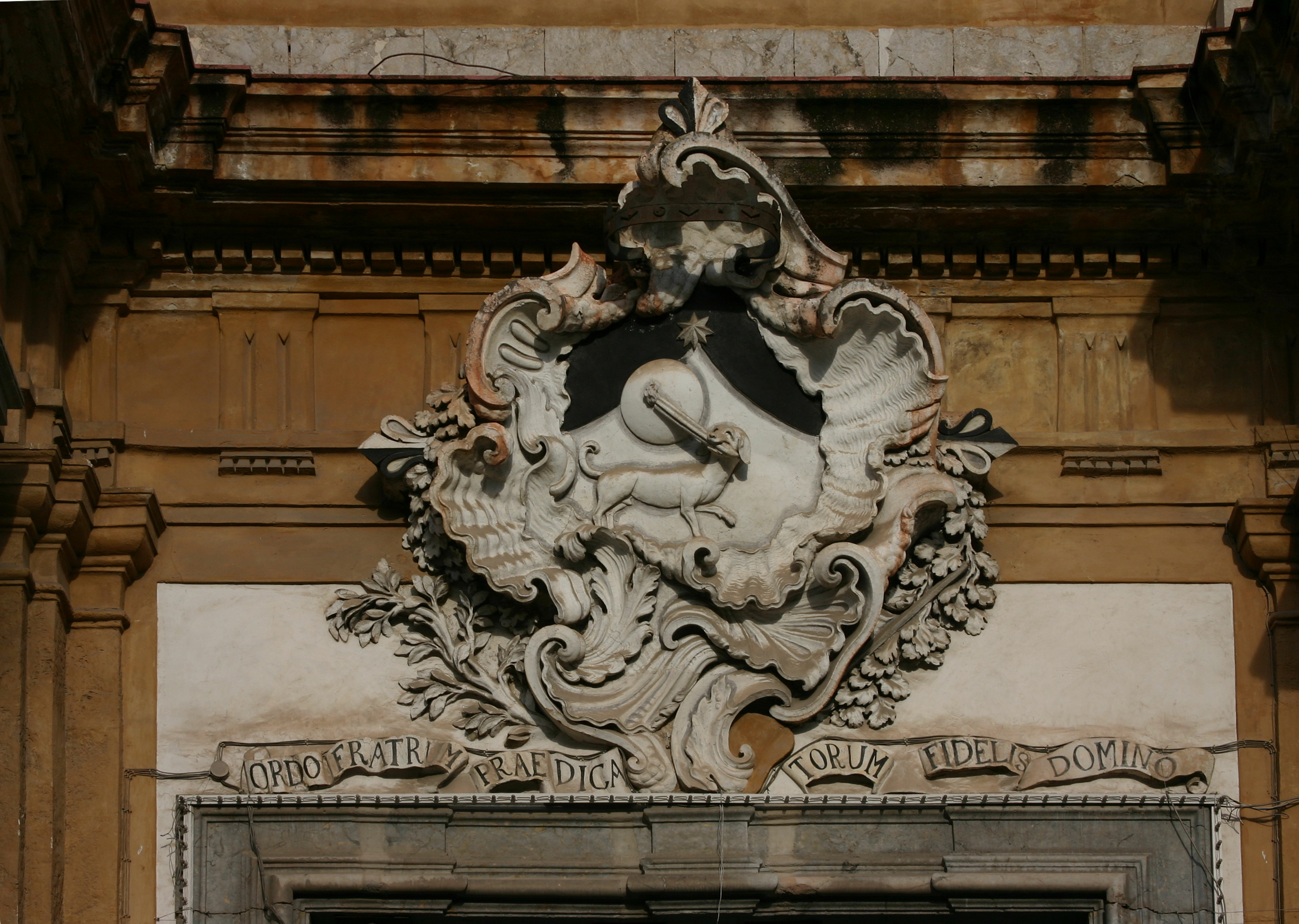
Symbol of the Dominican Order

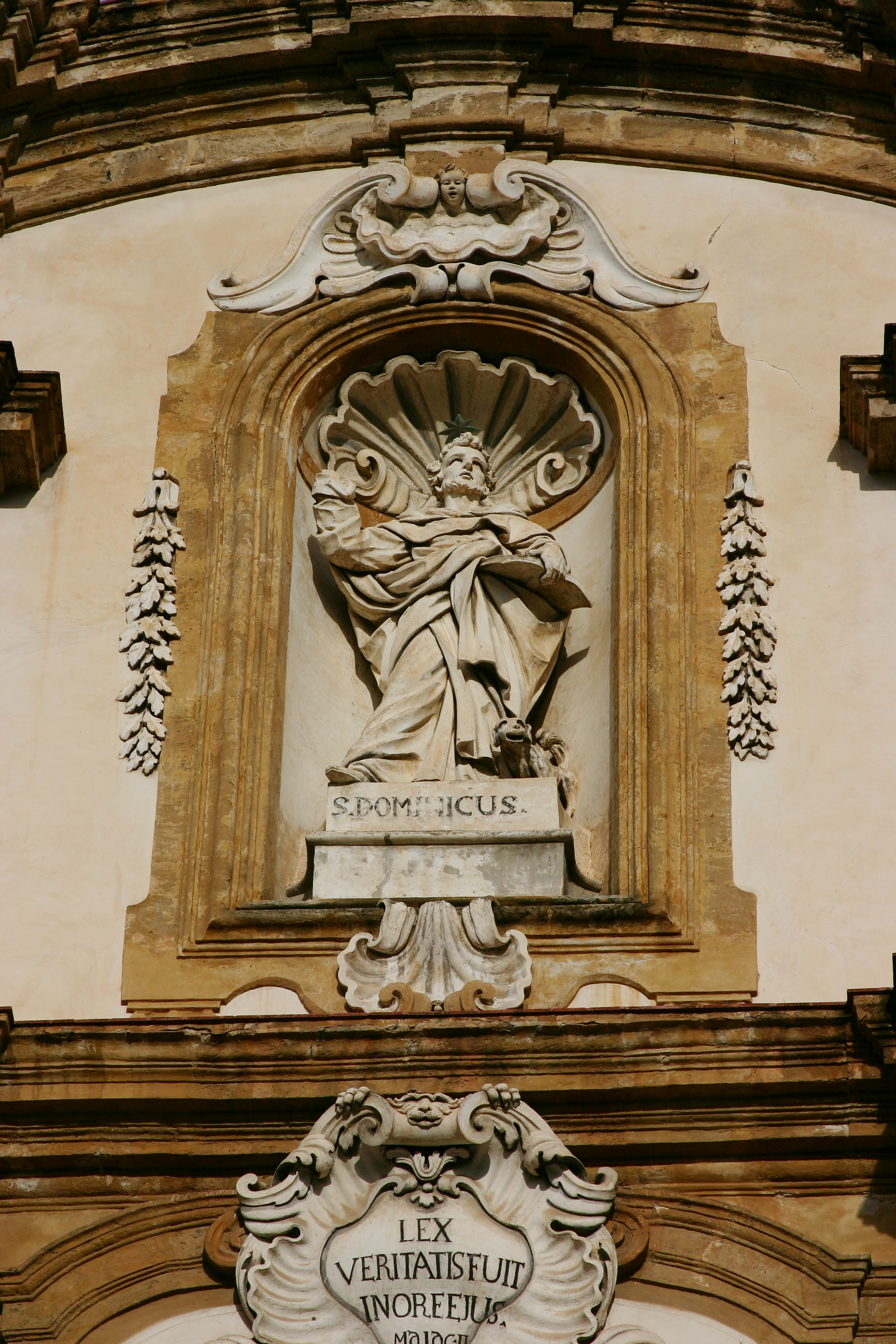
Statue of St Dominic

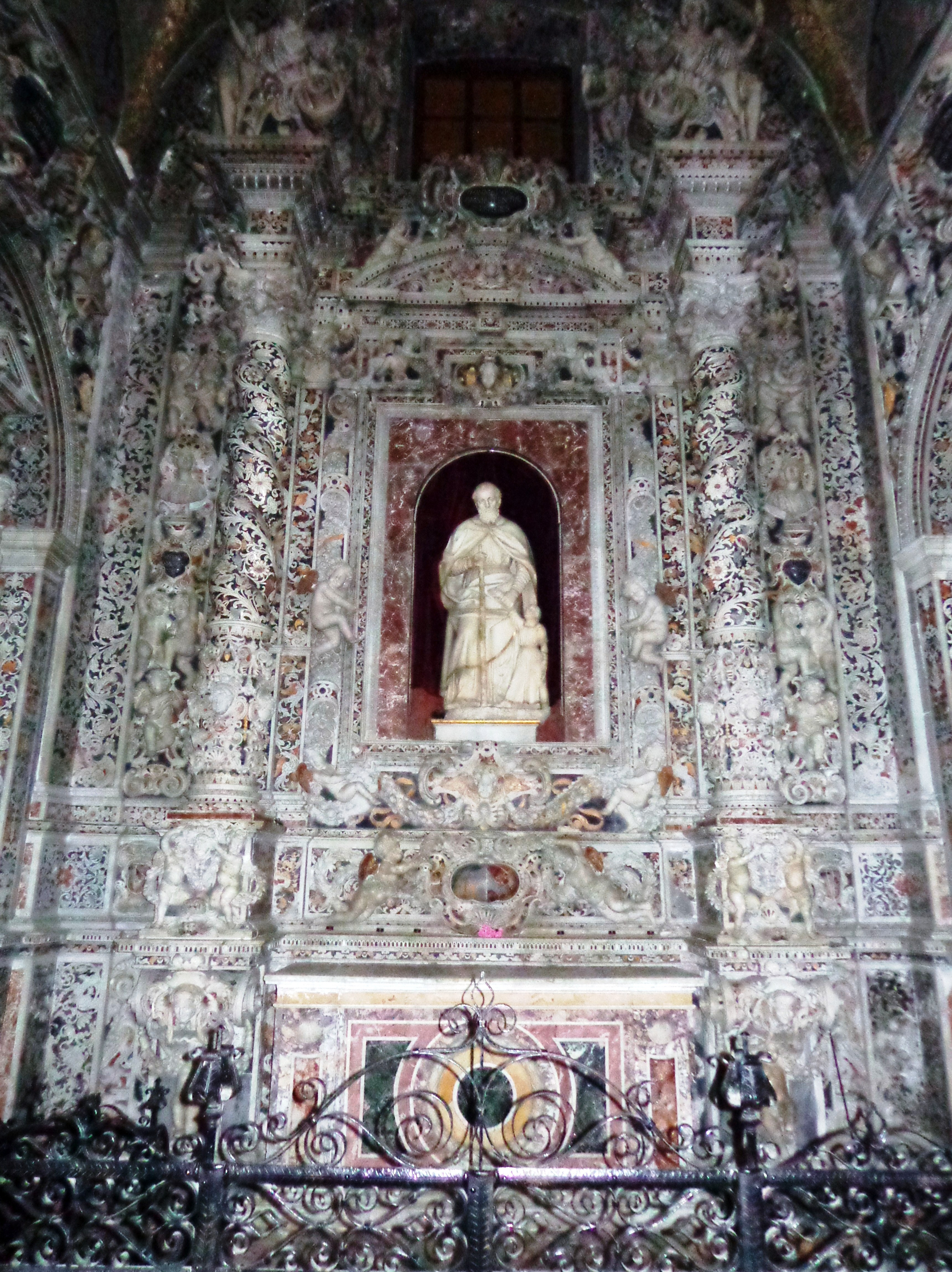
Chapel of Saint Joseph

San Domenico (Saint Dominic) is a Baroque-style Roman Catholic church, located on Piazza San Domenico, and located in the ancient quarter of La Loggia, in central Palermo, region of Sicily, Italy. Piazza San Domenico opens to Via Roma a few blocks south of the large Palazzo delle Poste, and a few blocks north of Sant'Antonio Abate and Teatro Biondo, is the northern border of the warren of alleys of the Vucciria neighborhood. The church houses the burial monuments of many notable Sicilians, and is known thus as the Pantheon of illustrious Sicilians.

== History ==
A Dominican church was built on this site between 1280 and 1285. The church was built Norman–Gothic style and had alongside a convent with a cloister that reproduced a small and simple copy of the more famous Benedictine cloister of Monreale. Inside this primitive church the son of James I of Cyprus, Odo, was buried in 1420 (or 1421).

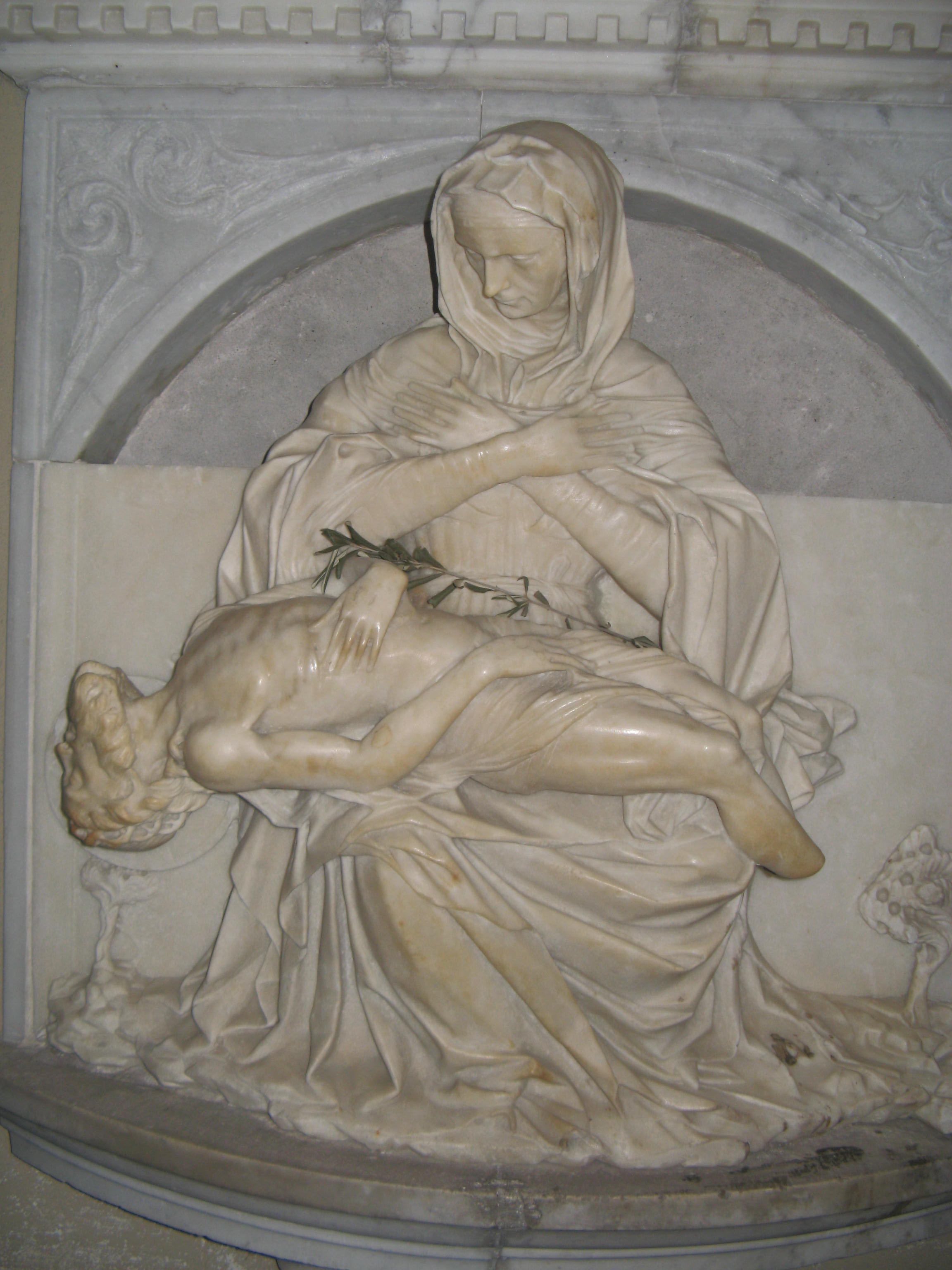
Pietà by Domenico Gagini.

By the beginning of the 15th century, the community of worshippers had outgrown the small medieval church, and the friars sought the support of Pope Martin V and patronage of the noble families of Palermo to build a new church, this time built in a Renaissance style. However, this building would also prove too small. Therefore, in 1630, the Dominicans of Palermo commissioned architect Andrea Cirrincione to build a new church. Ten years later, on 2 February 1640, there was the groundbreaking ceremony. The Baroque façade was completed only by 1726, while the left bell tower dates from 1770.

During the Sicilian revolution of 1848, in this church the Sicilian Parliament was called under the leadership of Ruggero Settimo. In 1853 the church became the pantheon of illustrious Sicilians.

== Convent ==
The convent, founded in 1300, is adjacent and north of the church and can be accessed from the latter's north aisle. The cloister, founded by the Chiaramonte family, has column and arches including capitals and spolia from the early 13th-century building.

The walls have paintings portraying Dominican saints, scenes of Apocalypse, of the Last Judgement and works by Nicola Spalletta from Caccamo. The interior houses a refectory and a large library.

The nearby Oratory of Rosario di San Domenico houses also 18th-century decoration and a main altarpiece by Anthony van Dyck.

== Burials ==
- Emerico Amari
- Michele Amari
- Stanislao Cannizzaro
- Francesco Crispi
- Gioacchino Di Marzo
- Giovanni Falcone (since 2015)
- Francesco Ferrara
- Francesco Maria Emanuele Gaetani
- Giovanni Meli
- Pietro Novelli
- Giuseppe Patania
- Errico Petrella
- Giuseppe Pitrè
- Vincenzo Riolo
- Ruggero Settimo
- Mariano Valguarnera

== See also ==
- Piazza San Domenico, Palermo
- Victory column: Colonna dell'Immacolata, Palermo
