= Valguarnera =

Valguarnera may refer to:

- Fabio Valguarnera, Italian wrestler
- Filippo Valguarnera (born 1977), Italian legal scholar
- Mariano Valguarnera (1564 – 1634), Italian philologist, historian and diplomat.
- Valguarnera Caropepe, comune in Sicily, Italy
- Palazzo Valguarnera-Gangi, historic house in Palermo, Sicily, Italy
