= The Second Grace =

Italian Indie Folk band

- Origin: Palermo, Sicily, Italy
- Genres: Indie folk
- Years active: 2005–2010
- Labels: Edel
- Members: Fabrizio Cammarata; Fabio Rizzo; John Riggio; Fabio Finocchio
- Website: www.thesecondgrace.com

The Second Grace is an Italian band based in Palermo, Sicily. Led by singer, acoustic guitarist, and main songwriter Fabrizio Cammarata, the band — also composed of slide guitarist and keyboardist Fabio Rizzo, bassist John Riggio, and drummer Fabio Finocchio — released its debut album in May 2007 on the label Edel. The Second Grace's sound is a gentle, folky mixture that draws from Caribbean, American, and English songwriting traditions.

The Second Grace's debut album was released on May, 25th for the label Edel, and the music video for the first single Antananarive gave popularity to the band, being aired on heavy rotation on MTV Italy. The video was shot by Sergi Capellas, and the location was Palermo and the narrow streets of the historical center (Vucciria, Ballarò).

The Second Grace have toured with and opened concerts for Iron & Wine, Devendra Banhart, Carmen Consoli, The Devastations, Dufus between 2005 and 2008.

== Discography ==
=== Albums ===
- The Second Grace (Released May, 25th 2007)
