= Via Roma, Palermo =

Street in Palermo, Italy

Via Roma
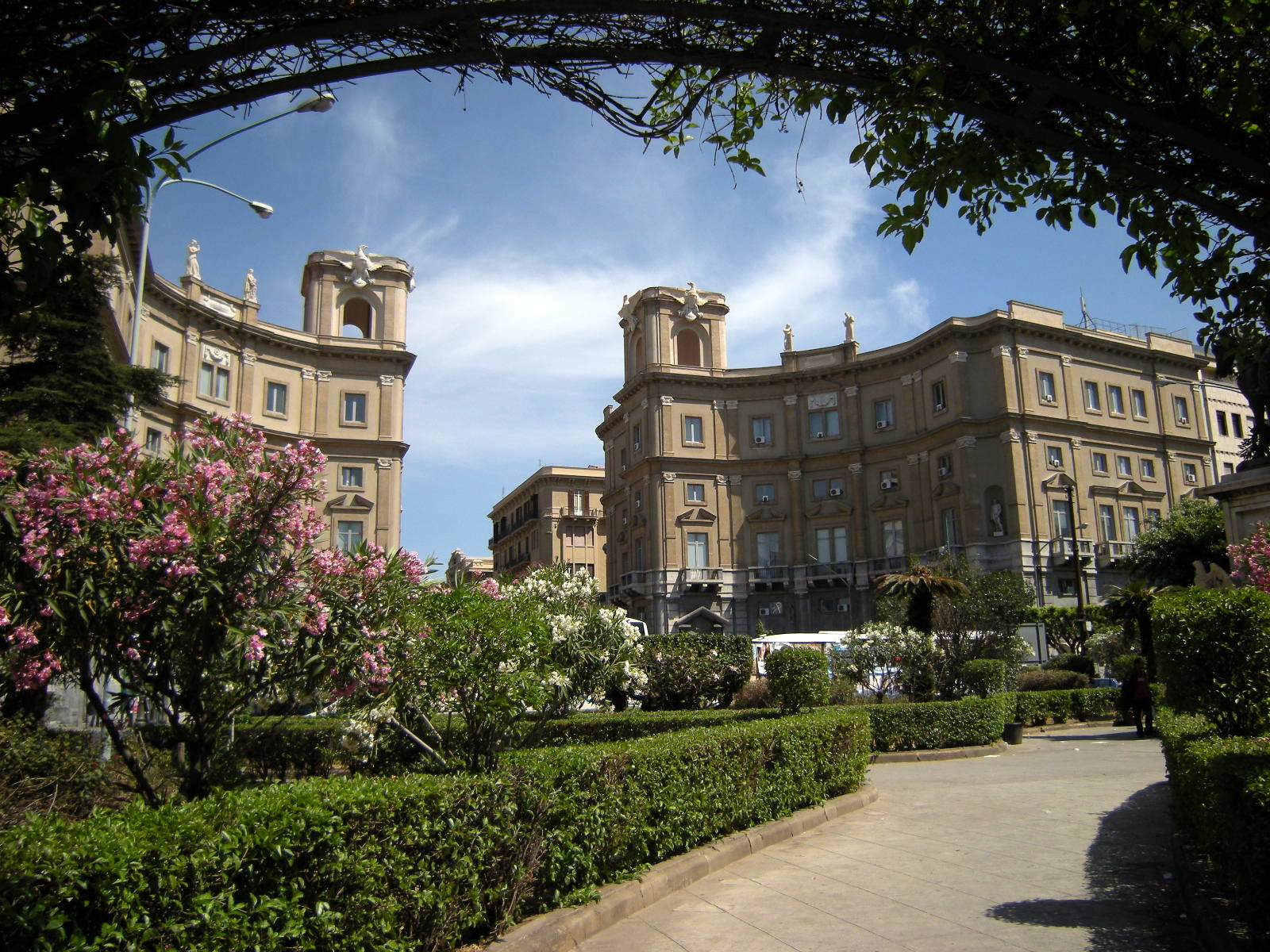
- Monumental entrance of Via Roma from Piazza Giulio Cesare
- Interactive map of Via Roma
- Location: Palermo, Sicily, Italy
- Coordinates: 38°07′08.83″N 13°21′43.85″E

Construction
- Construction start: 1894
- Completion: 1936

Via Roma is an important street of Palermo. It represents one of the main axes of the historic centre and connect the Palermo Centrale railway station to the Teatro Politeama. Several important buildings of the city appears along the street's path. Via Roma was designed with the 1885 Master Plan of Palermo (the so-called "Piano Giarrusso") and built between 1894 and 1936.

== Places of interest ==
- Vucciria
- Piazza San Domenico
- Church of San Domenico
- Church of Sant'Antonio Abate
- Anglican Church of the Holy Cross
- Palazzo delle Poste
- Palazzo delle Ferrovie
- Teatro Biondo

== Books ==
- Chirco A., Di Liberto M., Via Roma: la strada nuova del Novecento, Flaccovio, 2008
