= Piazza San Domenico, Palermo =

Square of Palermo, Sicily, Italy

Piazza San Domenico
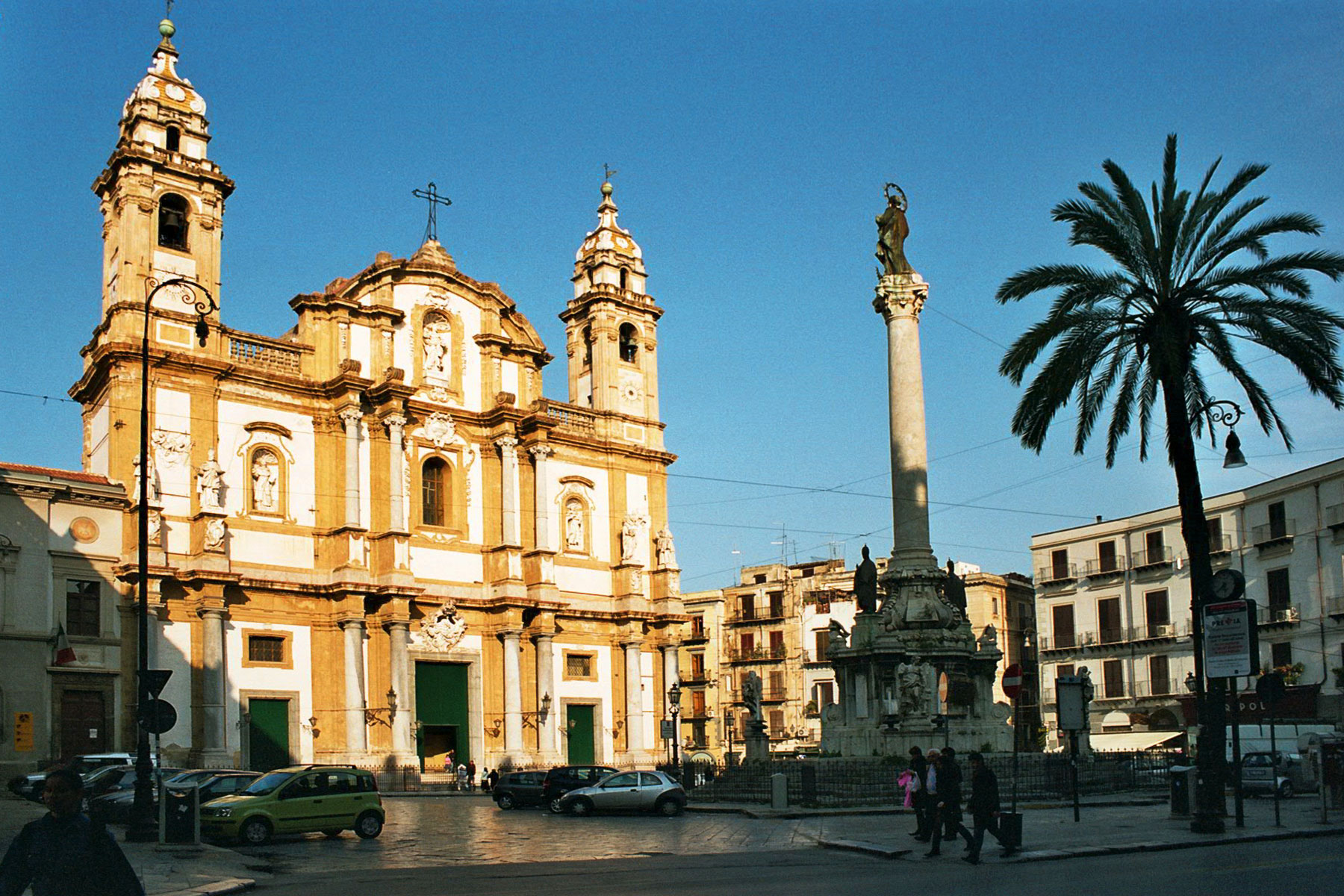
- The facade of the church and the column of the Immaculate Conception
- Interactive map of Piazza San Domenico
- Location: Palermo, Sicily, Italy
- Coordinates: 38°07′08.46″N 13°21′48.18″E

Piazza San Domenico is a square of Palermo, Sicily, southern Italy. It is located down Via Roma, in the quarter of La Loggia, within the historic centre of Palermo. The square derives its name from the Church of San Domenico, one of the famous city sights. In the past it was called "Piazza Imperiale" (Imperial Square), because its creation was decided by the Emperor Charles VI.

The middle of the square is dominated by the Column of the Immaculate Conception, designed by Tommaso Napoli in 1724 and erected by Giovanni Biagio Amico in 1728. The former Dominican convent overlooking the square is the location of the Museo del Risorgimento. Moreover, the square represents an entrance to the La Vucciria, one of the historical markets of Palermo.
