= Teatro Biondo =

Theatre in Palermo, Italy

Coordinates: 38°07′03″N 13°21′45.72″E

Biondo Theatre
- Teatro Biondo
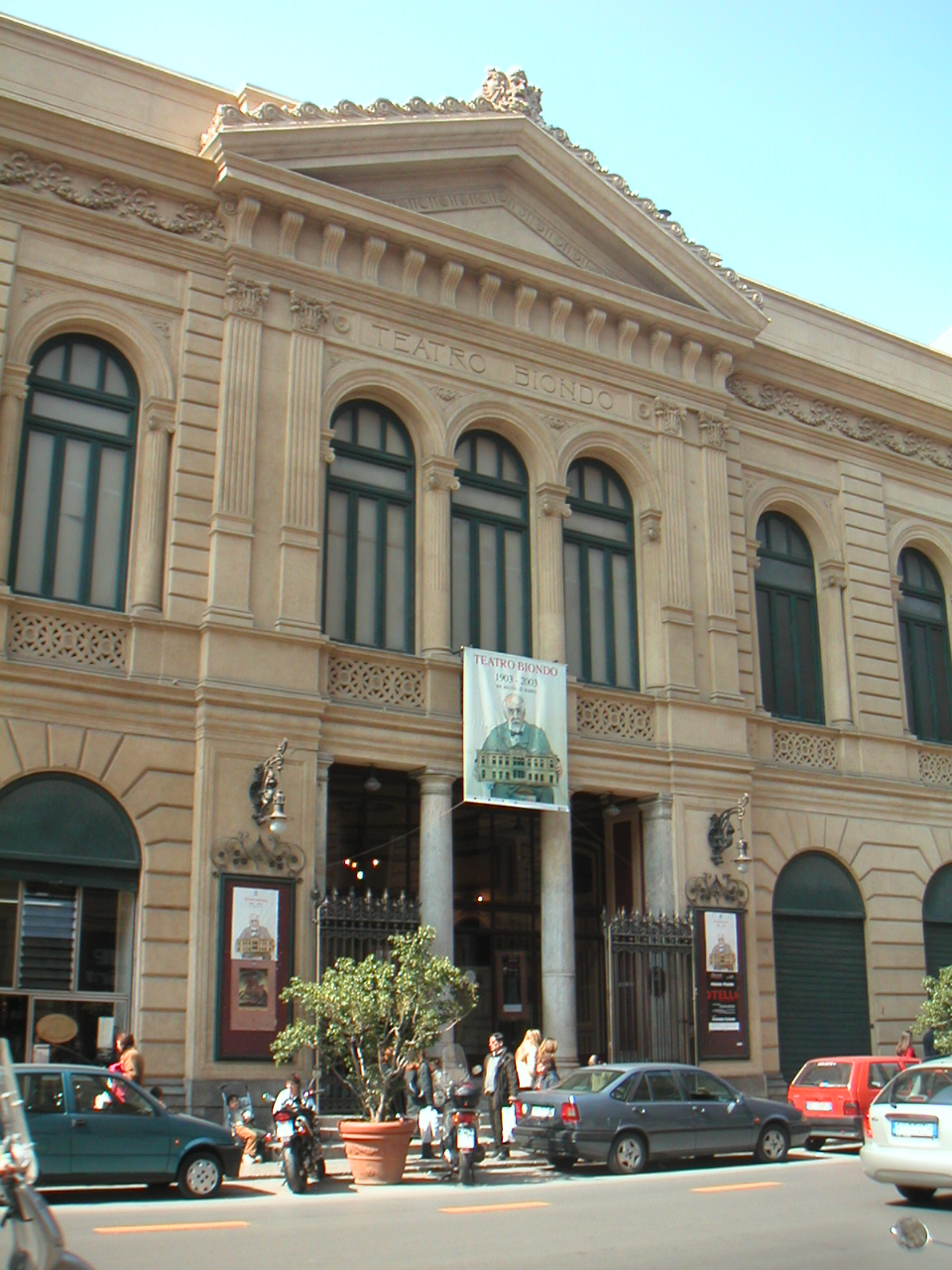
- Entrance of the Teatro Biondo
- Interactive map of Biondo Theatre
- Full name: Teatro Biondo Stabile
- Address: Via Roma, 258
- Location: Palermo, Italy
- Owner: Comune of Palermo
- Capacity: 950

Construction
- Built: 1899-1903
- Architect: Nicolò Mineo

Website
- www.teatrobiondo.it

The Biondo Theatre (Italian: Teatro Biondo, complete name Teatro Biondo Stabile) is a neoclassical and Art Nouveau-style theater building located on Via Roma #258, corner with Via Venezia, in the ancient quarter of Castellamare of central Palermo, region of Sicily, Italy. Diagonally across Via Roma is the ancient church of Sant'Antonio Abate and a stairwell descending into the warrens of the Vucciria Market.

== History ==
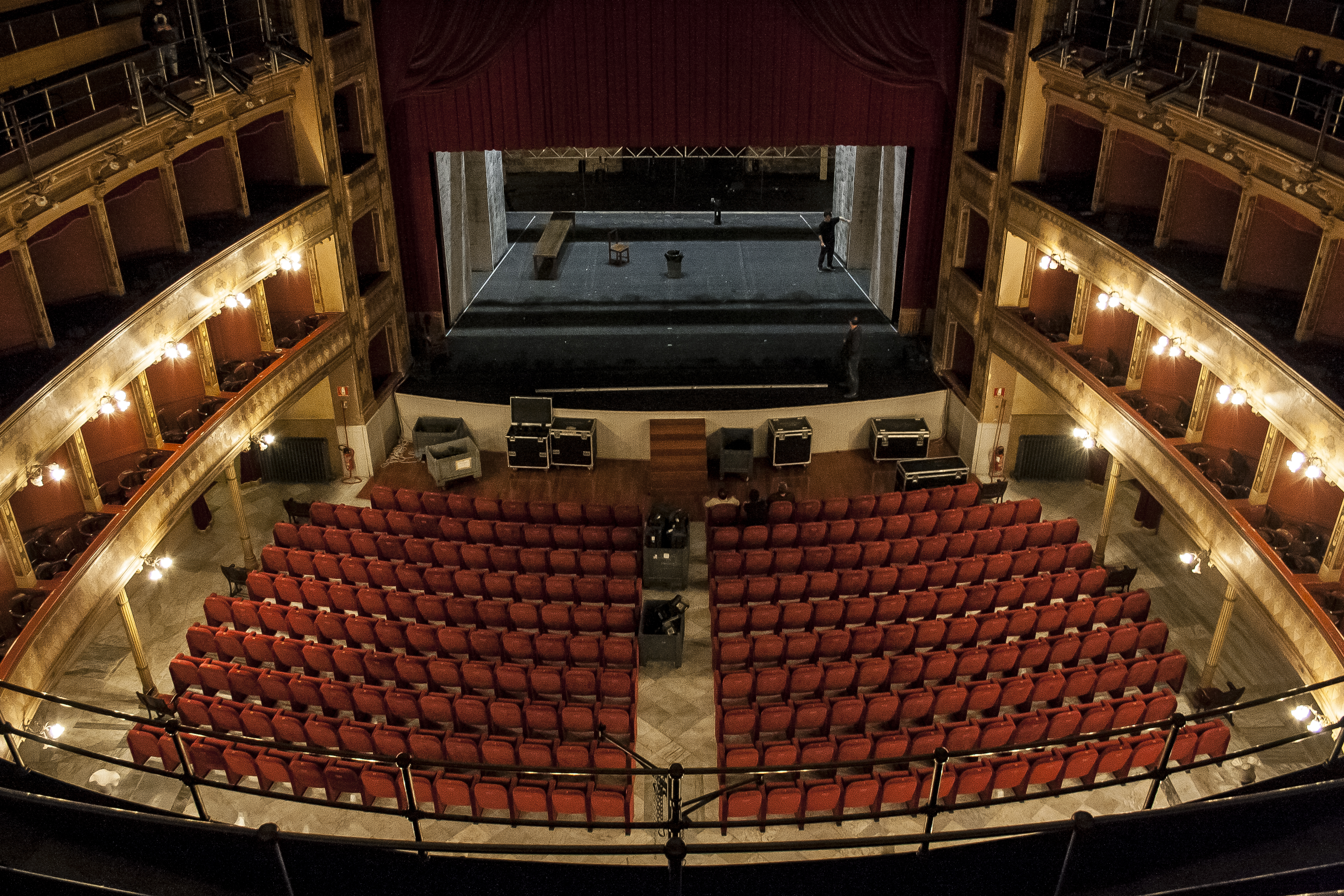
View of the main stage

By the start of the 20th century, the main performance halls in Palermo were the Teatro Santa Cecilia, the Teatro Bellini, and the Teatro Garibaldi. Three institutions were built in the following, each with a different spectacle in mind. The Teatro Massimo for opera, the Teatro Politeama for popular concerts and spectacles, and the Biondo for dramatic performances. The Biondo brothers, Andrea, Eugenio and Luigi, were wealthy entrepreneurs and a lawyer and owned a prominent publishing house in Palermo. Andrea, the lawyer commissioned the design from engineer Nicolò Mineo, who collaborated with Giacomo Nicolai and Antonio Lo Bianco. Starting in June 1902, construction lasted for 16 months.

The interior is richly decorated with polychrome marble: yellow from Segesta, pink from Castellammare, and white from Carrara. The fresco and stucco decoration were mainly led by Salvatore Gregorietti, with contributions by Carmelo Giarrizzo, Francesco Padovano, Francesco La Cagnina, Onofrio Tomaselli.

On 15 October 1903 it was inaugurated by the theater company of Ermete Novelli, performing the play of Papà Lebonnard by Jean Aicard. It was followed by plays such as Il burbero benefico of Goldoni, The Merchant of Venice by Shakespeare, and Luigi XI by Jean-François Delavigne. At the end of the 1920s, the financial crisis led the Biondo family to use the theater for motion picture. The theater remained in the Biondo family till 1980s, when a larger group, including the provincial and municipal government established a collaborative ownership. It still remains an active house for dramatic performances.
