= Emerico Amari =

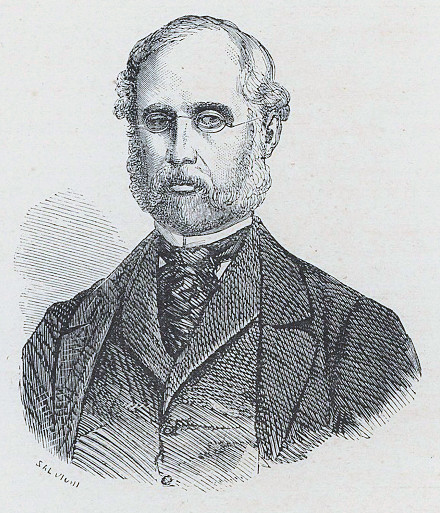

Emerico Amari (1810–1870) was an Italian jurist and a pioneer of comparative law.

Although of Sicilian aristocratic origin, Amari was a liberal thinker. After assuming the University of Palermo professorship for penal law in 1841, he entered politics in 1848 and fled shortly thereafter to Florence, where he taught philosophy until his return to Sicily in 1860.

Although he began his career as a penal law specialist with an interest in criminal statistics, his main work is the seminal Criticism of the science of comparative law of 1857.

== Biography ==
Emerico Amari belonged to an ancient and noble Palermo family: his father was the Count of S. Adriano Mariano Salvatore Amari, deputy in the Sicilian Parliament of 1812, and his mother, Rosalia Baiardi belonged to the family of the Marquises of S. Carlo. The couple had illustrious children, one of whom, Count Michele Amari, was a namesake of Senator Michele Amari, a Risorgimento patriot and great scholar of Muslim Sicily.

Having completed his initial studies with the Scolopian fathers at the Colasanzio college in Palermo, Emeric enrolled at the University of Palermo, Jurisprudence with a degree in law. He practiced the profession of law for a very short time, soon leaving it to take up disciplines more congenial to him such as philosophy, publishing in 1833 in the Effemeridi scientifiche letterarie a paper entitled Sopra gli elementi di filosofia del Prof. V. Tedeschi where he advanced criticism of Kantian thought, then prevalent in Sicilian intellectual circles, in the name of John Locke empiricism and Gian Domenico Romagnosi thought.

From 1836 he began his work as a correspondent with articles on legal and economic Laissez-faire topics in the Journal of Statistics. These themes he repeated in his teaching of criminal law from 1841 to 1848 at the University of Palermo, where he attracted the attention of the House of Bourbon-Two Sicilies police for an applauded lecture he gave in December 1842 on the death penalty.

This widespread reputation of his as a liberal opponent, refreshed by an impassioned speech he gave in Palermo on November 28, 1847, at Villa Giulia before a large crowd, meant that, two days before the outbreak of the Sicilian revolution of 1848, he was arrested but released after a few days when the Bourbon army retreated to Naples. Elected deputy of Salemi and Palermo he worked for a new Sicilian constitution and was sent by the revolutionary government as ambassador along with patriots Giuseppe La Farina (1815 - 1863) and Francesco Ferrara (1810 - 1900) to Turin to offer the crown of Sicily to the Duke of Genoa.

When Bourbon troops reoccupied Palermo restoring the monarchy in 1849, Emerico Amari fled first to Malta and later to Genoa.

During his exile, he kept up a long correspondence with his friend Francesco Ferrara, with whom he was exiled, and collaborated on economics journals, publishing, in 1857, his most important work, which had great resonance in Italy and abroad: La Critica di una scienza delle legislazioni comparate where he dealt with law in the light of the philosophy of history, a subject in which he became a teacher in 1859 at the Institute of Higher Studies in Florence.

In 1860, after Giuseppe Garibaldi successful feat of the Thousand, he returned to Palermo and was commissioned by the provisional government to find solutions that would bring southern conditions in line with the rest of the nation, but he soon resigned from the task assigned to him, realizing that Garibaldi's entire enterprise had been resolved by a mere annexation of the Savoy dynasty, by the government inspired by a rigid centralism. He then turned down public positions that were offered to him, including an offer by Senator Michele Amari, minister of public education, of the chair of law and comparative legislation at the University of Palermo.

Proposed as a candidate by the entire parliamentary political spectrum, Emerico Amari was elected as a deputy to the first Parliament of the Kingdom of Italy.His resignation submitted a year later, due to his son Henry's fatal illness, was rejected, but Emeric, though elected again in 1867, eventually retired from parliamentary life. Instead, he accepted from 1868 representation on the Palermo Municipality, which he held until his death, which occurred due to an unknown illness on September 20, 1870, the very day when, with Rome as the capital of Italy, the Risorgimento process was concluded.

By the will of the municipality of Palermo in his memory a statue representing him was erected in the San Domenico, Palermo where he was buried and a central street in the same city was named after him.

== Bibliography ==
- Speck, Ulrich (2001). "Emerico Amari". In Michael Stolleis (ed.). Juristen: ein biographisches Lexikon; von der Antike bis zum 20. Jahrhundert (in German) (2nd ed.). München: Beck. p. 33. ISBN 3-406-45957-9.
