= Palazzo delle Poste, Palermo =

Governmental building in Palermo, Sicily

Coordinates: 38.1201°N 13.3614°E

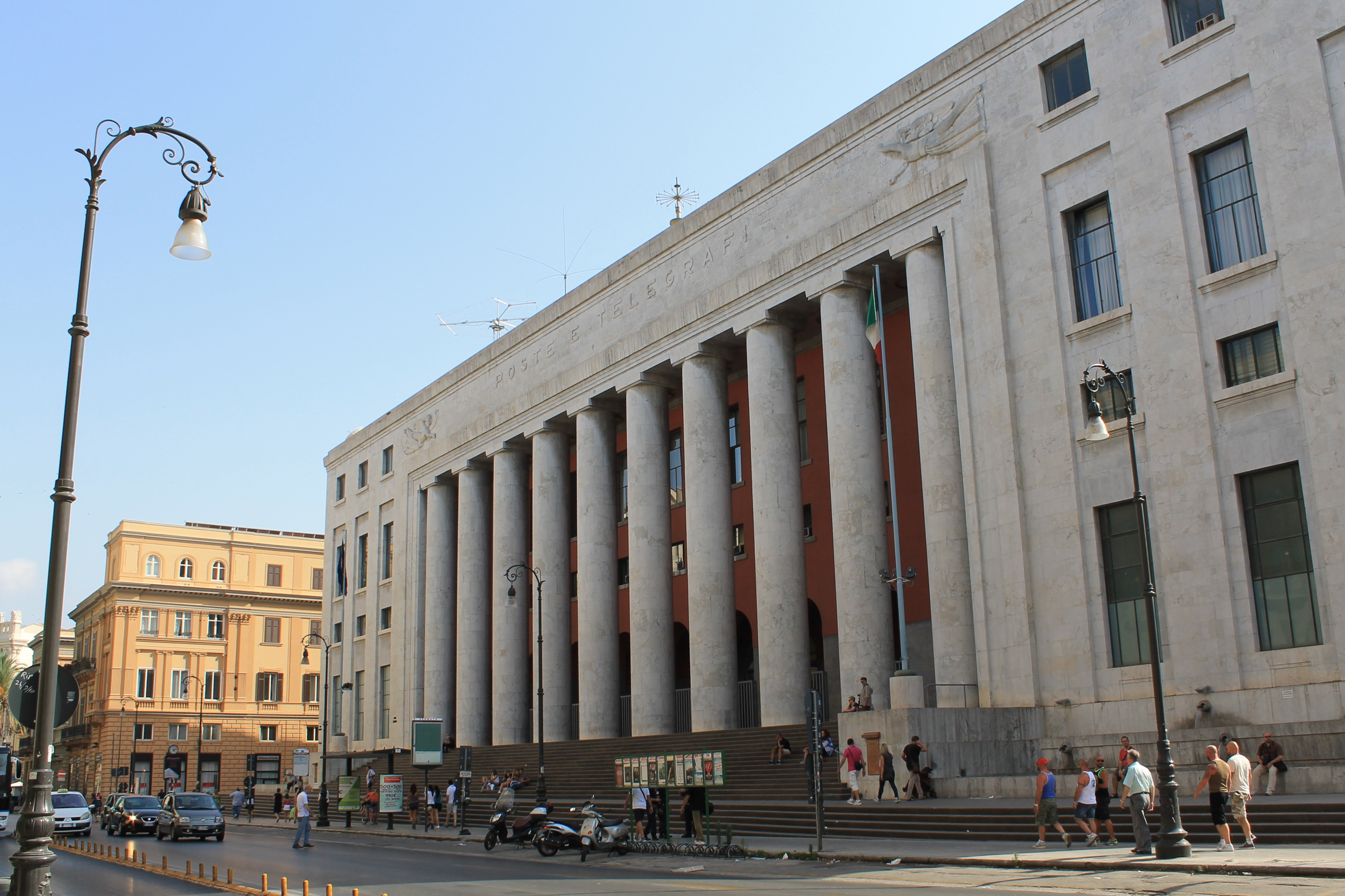
The Palazzo delle Poste building in Palermo

The Palazzo delle Poste or Palazzo Postale is a monumental government building, executed in the rationalist architectural style of the 1920s, originally intended as the mail and telegraph center, located on Via Roma #320, in the quarter of Castellammare in Palermo, region of Sicily, Italy. The modern building is bordered on the north by the church of the Sant'Ignazio all'Olivella and the adjacent Regional Archeologic Museum, while Piazza San Domenico is a few blocks to the south.

== History ==
The building was designed by the rationalist, and later fascist, government architect Angiolo Mazzoni in the early 1920s. Construction was begun on the structure in 1929 and the building was inaugurated in 1934 with the Italian government's communications minister Umberto Puppini in attendance. The Palermo flood occurred from February 21–23, 1931 while the building was being constructed and during that time a large crane which was being used to erect the post office collapsed onto a neighboring building.

The building was damaged by fire in 1988, and reopened for tours in 2017 after restoration.

The building is featured in episode #4, "From Palermo to Mt. Etna" (which premiered on August 26. 2020), of Great Continental Railway Journeys on the BBC and presented by Michael Portillo.

== Architecture ==
=== The building ===
The style of the building is typical of the fascist period and falls under the rubric of Italian Rationalism. It covers an area of 5100 m^{2}, which is symmetrically structured around two side courtyards. The structure is rendered in reinforced concrete and clad in gray marble from Mount Billiemi. The front colonnade is formed by 10 columns each 30 meters high. Also of note is the large elliptical staircase with a diameter greater than 9 meters.

=== Interiors ===
The interiors are done in the style of Futurism, one of the few examples an interior created as such from the time. All the details were attended to by Mazzoni, such as; the copper-clad doors, the specially designed window handles, the lighting, and the choice of marble and stone, all from Italy except the black stone of the staircase, as he desired.

Most striking perhaps is the conference room, with works by the Futurist painter Benedetta Cappa, Called Sintesi delle Comunicazioni (Synthesis of Communication) the five murals which measure 6½ ft (2 m) by 10 ft (3.05 m), were painted by Cappa in 1933 and 1934 in tempera and encaustic (a wax process) on canvas and depict land, sea, air, and telegraphic and radio communications. As well as trying to convey the complexity of the Futurist vision, which sought to break free of the burden of history and propel Italy into the future, at the same time they were designed to invoke resonances with the frescoes of ancient Pompeii. In 2014 the murals were loaned for exhibition at the Guggenheim Museum in New York. There are also two paintings by Tato and another by Piero Bevilacqua, "Radio and television". Finally there is a bronze sculpture by Corrado Vigni, "Diana the Huntress".

The waiting room which precedes the conference room is impressive as well with an intense blue tiling.

Originally on the right side of the building there was a large Victorian beam, as tall as the entire building and also in marble, which was removed at the fall of the fascist regime.

== Gallery ==
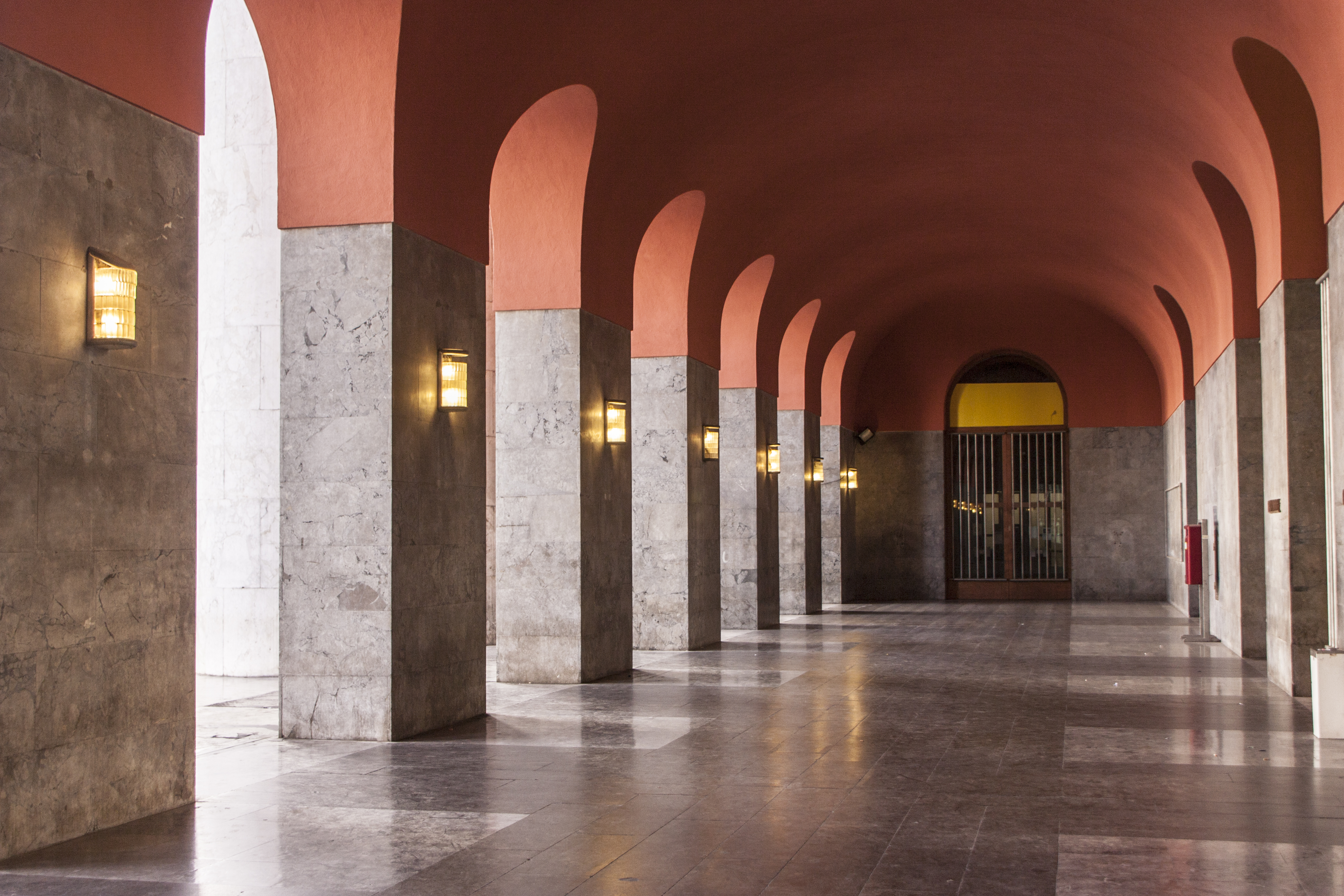
Entrance

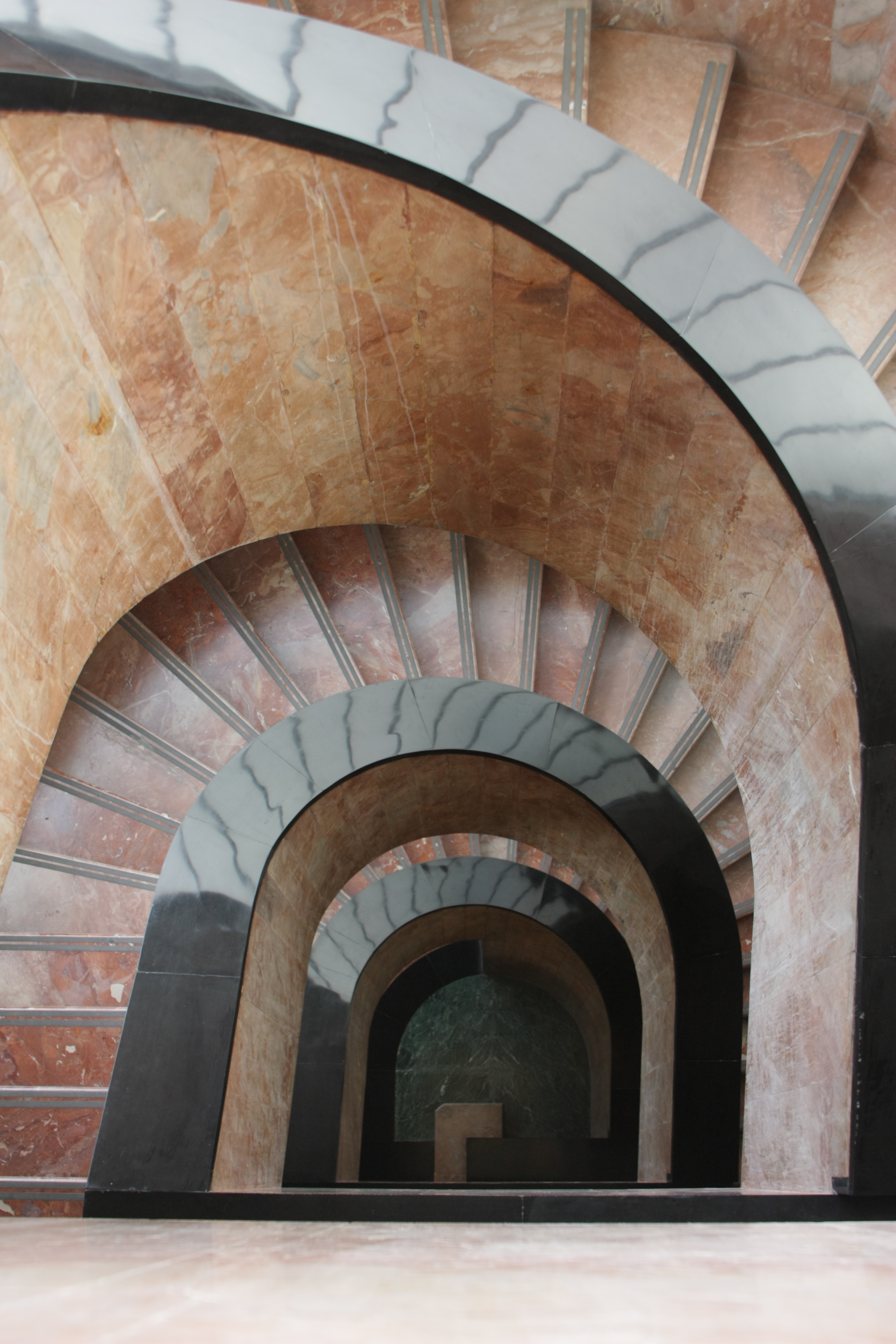
Staircase

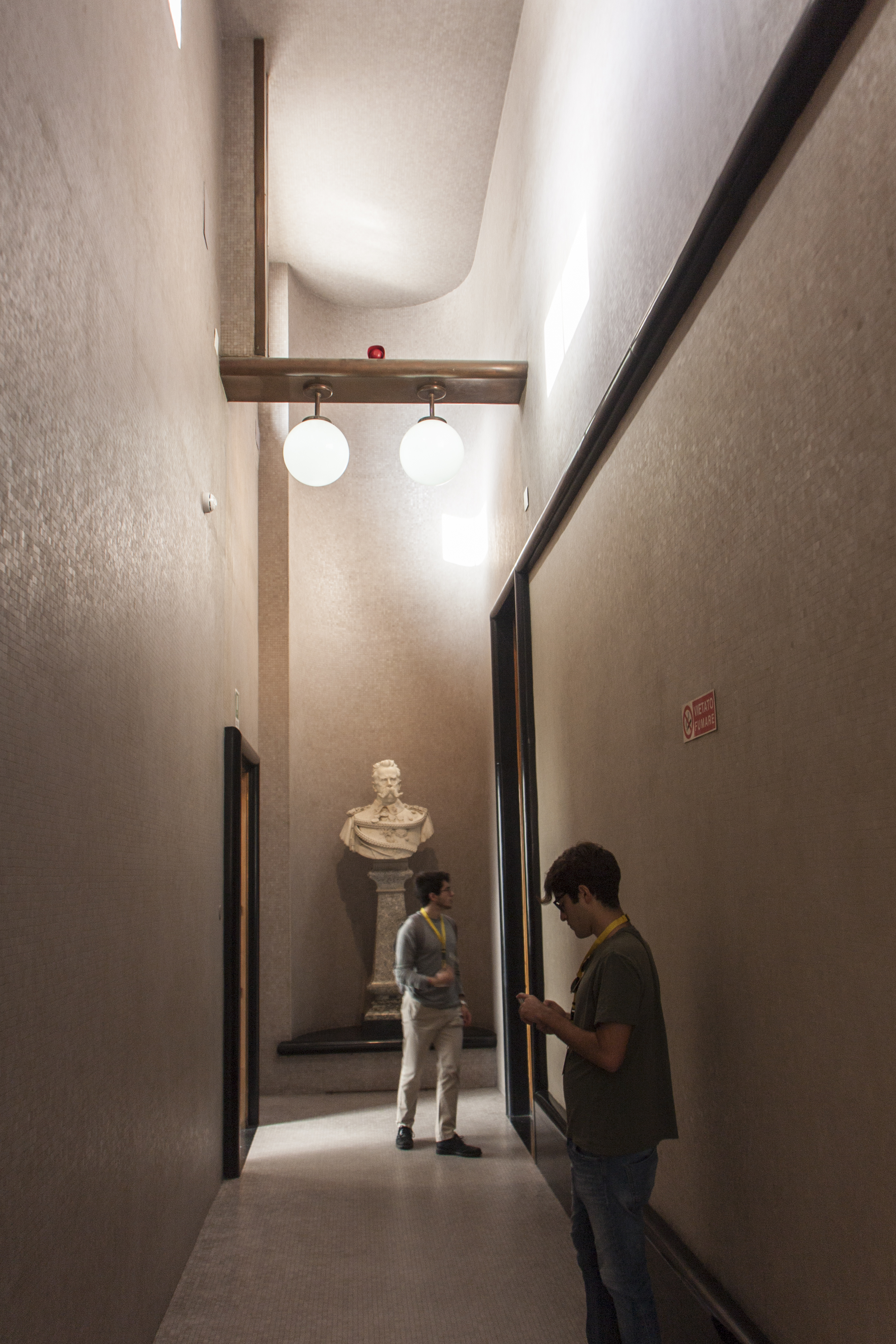
Corridor

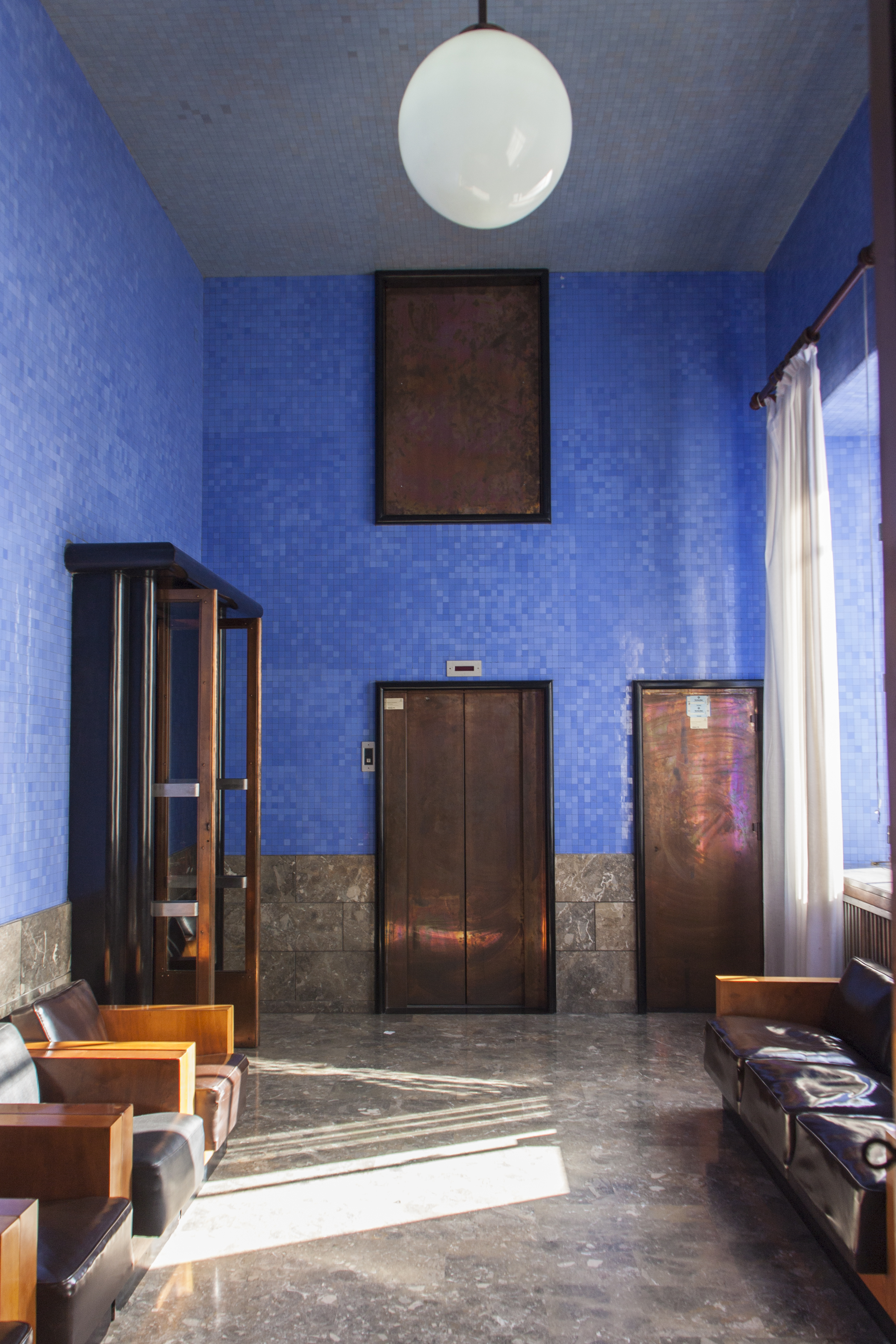
Waiting room

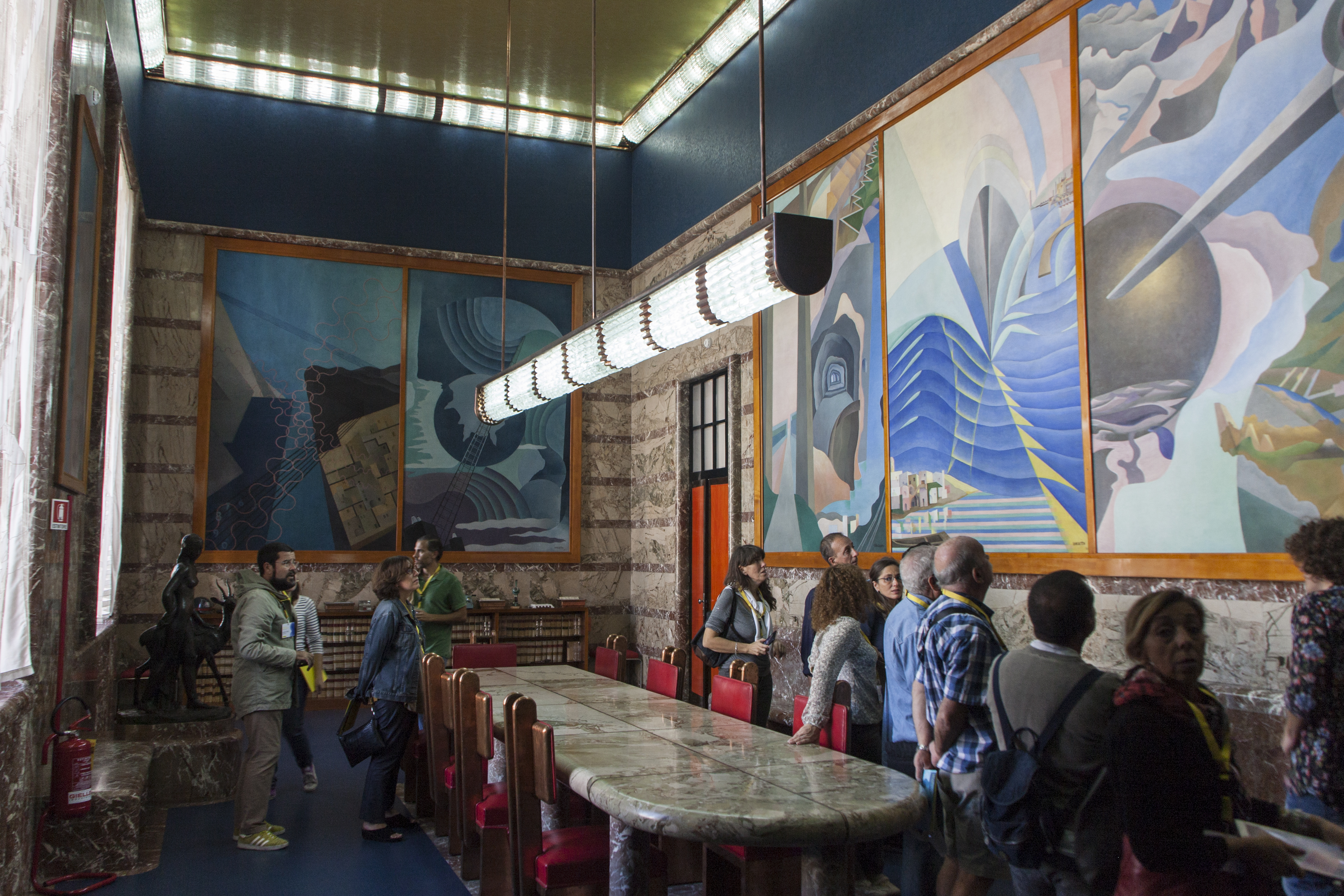
Conference room
