= Filippo Valguarnera =

Italian-Swedish legal scholar dedicated (born 1977)

Filippo Valguarnera (born August 27, 1977) is an Italian-Swedish legal scholar dedicated mainly to the study of access to nature and access to justice. He earned his law degree and Ph.D. at the University of Florence (Italy). Filippo Valguarnera spent time as a visiting fellow at Uppsala University and New York University. Filippo Valguarnera is currently member of the law faculty at University of Gothenburg (Sweden). Filippo Valguarnera leads together with Ugo Mattei (University of California - Hastings) and Saki Bailey (International University College of Turin) a research project on access to commons in the frame of the Common Core of European Private Law.

== Selected writings ==
2014 - Accesso alla natura tra ideologia e diritto (2nd edition) ISBN 978-88-3487825-5
2008 - La tradizione giuridica dei Paesi nordici (with Alessandro Simoni) ISBN 978-88-348-8760-8
