= Fabrizio Cammarata =

Italian footballer and manager

Personal information
- Date of birth: 30 August 1975 (age 51)
- Place of birth: Caltanissetta, Italy
- Position: Striker

Team information
- Current team: Kamarat (head coach)

Youth career
- –1993: Juventus

Senior career*
Years	Team	Apps	(Gls)
1993–1994	Juventus	0	(0)
1994–1996	Verona	65	(18)
1996–1997	Torino	21	(3)
1997–1998	Pescara	28	(5)
1998–2000	Verona	61	(24)
2000–2004	Cagliari	107	(24)
2004	Parma	8	(0)
2004–2005	Catanzaro	17	(1)
2005–2006	Pescara	34	(7)
2006–2007	Taranto	39	(9)
2008	Salernitana	9	(0)
2008	Pro Patria	9	(0)
2009	Sambenedettese	16	(5)
2009–2010	Vastese	23	(9)
2010–2011	RC Angolana		
2011–2012	Sulmona		

Managerial career
- 2012–2016: Pescara (youth)
- 2017–2018: Akhmat Grozny (youth)
- 2019–2020: Dinamo Tirana
- 2021: Apolonia
- 2021–2023: Melbourne Victory (assistant)
- 2023–2025: Al Nasr (Under 21)
- 2023: Al Nasr (Interim)
- 2025–2026: Kamarat
- * Club domestic league appearances and goals

- ‘’‘2026-’’’: Akragas

Fabrizio Cammarata (born 30 August 1975) is an Italian football manager and a former player, currently in charge of Eccellenza Sicily club Akragas.

== Career ==
=== Playing career ===
Cammarata started his career with Italian Serie A side Juventus. In 1994, Cammarata signed for Verona in the Italian second division, where he made 65 league appearances and scored 18 goals, helping them earn promotion to the Italian top flight. Before the second half of 2003–04, he signed for Italian Serie A club Parma. In 2004, Cammarata signed for Catanzaro in the Italian second division. In 2006, he signed for Italian third division team Taranto. In 2010, he signed for RC Angolana in the Italian fourth division. In 2011, Cammarata signed for Italian fifth division outfit Sulmona.

=== Managerial career ===
He started coaching in 2012 in Sulmona, and a few months later began coaching the Pescara youth team until 2016. In 2017, he was appointed youth manager of Akhmat in Russia. In 2019, he was appointed manager of Albanian second division side Dinamo Tirana. In 2021, Cammarata was appointed manager of Apolonia in the Albanian top flight. In 2021, he was appointed assistant manager of Australian club Melbourne Victory. In February 2022, he participated in the victory of the FFA Cup. After two seasons in Australia, he was appointed manager of Al Nasr under 21 in UAE. In November 2023 he was appointed coach of Al-Nasr first team interim coach. After the new coach was signed, he returned to the under-21 team.

On 6 November 2025, Cammarata was hired as the new head coach of Eccellenza Sicily amateurs Kamarat, hailing from the town he shared his surname with.
