= Nicolò Mineo =

Italian literary critic, literary historian and philologist (1932–2023)

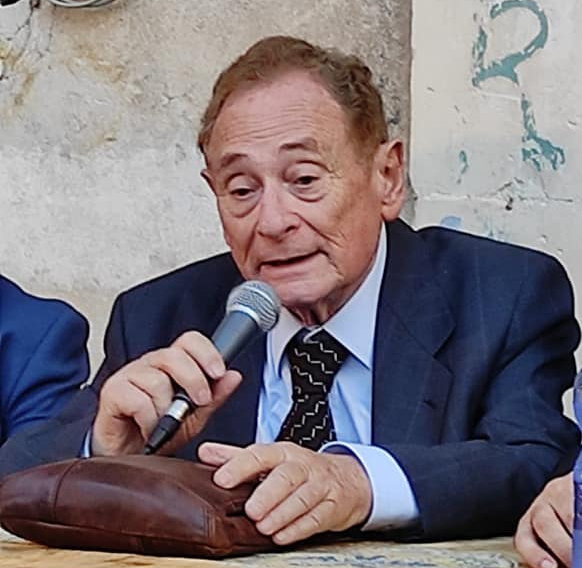
- Born: 2 January 1934; Alcamo, Trapani, Kingdom of Italy
- Died: 6 February 2023 (aged 89); Giarre, Catania, Italy

Nicolò Mineo (2 January 1934 – 6 February 2023) was an Italian literary critic, literary historian and philologist. He was professor emeritus of Italian literature at the University of Catania from 2010.

== Life and career ==
Born in Alcamo, in 1956 Mineo graduated in Classical Literature at the University of Catania with a thesis on Giosuè Carducci and got a master's in Modern Philology at the Normale University in Pisa.

After working as a liceo classico teacher and a voluntary university assistant, in 1980 he became a full professor in his Alma Mater, and later was nominated head of the Department of Modern Philology and president of the Faculty of Letters and Philosophy. He was also visiting professor at La Sorbonne and at the University of Tours.

The main object of Mineo's studies was Dante Alighieri, to whom he dedicated a large number of essays and studies, notably a Dante monograph first published in 1970 and which had numerous new editions over the years. He was a founding member of the Société dantesque de France, and the founder of the Lectura Dantis association. Mineo was also regarded as a major scholar of Giovanni Verga and Verismo.

A former Italian Socialist Party of Proletarian Unity member, between 1998 and 2004 Mineo served as Councillor for Culture and Education in Giarre. He died in Giarre on 6 February 2023, at the age of 89.
