= Mariano Valguarnera =

Italian philologist, writer and diplomat

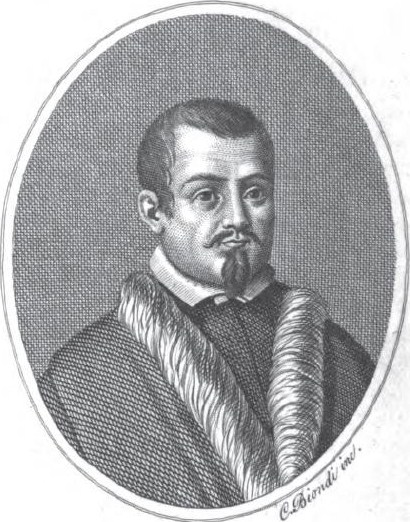
- Engraving by Carlo Biondi, 1819
- Born: 7 October 1564; Palermo, Kingdom of Sicily
- Died: 28 August 1634 (aged 69); Palermo, Kingdom of Sicily
- Resting place: San Domenico, Palermo
- Occupations: Classical scholar; Writer; Diplomat
- Spouse: Vittoria Ferreri
- Parent: Fabrizio Valguarnera
- Writing career
- Language: Italian, Latin, Greek
- Notable works: Discorso dell'origine ed antichità di Palermo, e de' primi abitatori della Sicilia, e dell'Italia (1614)

Mariano Valguarnera (7 October 1564 – 28 August 1634) was an Italian philologist, writer and diplomat.

== Biography ==
Mariano Valguarnera was the son of Fabrizio Valguarnera, baron Godrano. He knew classical and modern languages (Latin, Greek, Hebrew, French, Spanish), and studied theology, philosophy and mathematics. After the death of his wife he became a priest. In 1629 he participated in a diplomatic mission to Madrid. His diplomatic talent was appreciated by Philip IV of Spain, who made him royal chaplain and abbot. After returning to Italy, he lived at the court of Pope Urban VIII, on whose behalf he translated and commented the works of Anacreon. He died on August 28, 1634, and was buried in the church of San Domenico in Palermo (the Pantheon of Sicily). His most important work is Il Discorso dell'origine ed antichità di Palermo e dei primi abitatori della Sicilia (Discourse on the Origin and Antiquity of Palermo and the first inhabitants of Sicily) (1614).

== Works ==
- Valguarnera, Mariano. Urbano VIII. Pont. Opt. Max. De ipsius poematis προσκυνητικὰ τρίγλωττα Mariani Valguarnerae (PDF) (in Greek, Latin, and Italian).
- Valguarnera, Mariano (1614). Discorso dell'origine ed antichità di Palermo, e de' primi abitatori della Sicilia, e dell'Italia (in Italian). Palermo: Giovanni Battista Maringo.
  - Johann Lorenz von Mosheim published a Latin translation of this work, which was included by Burman in the thirteenth volume of his Thesaurus Antiquitatum et Historiarum Siciliae (online)
- Memoriale della Deputatione del Regno di Sicilia, e della città di Palermo intorno alla divisione di quel Regno, che tenta la città di Messina, tradotto dalla lingua Spagnola in Italiana dal Dott. D. Francesco Paruta. Panormi, apud Alphonsum de Isola, 1630, in-fol.
- Epigrammata, & Anagrammata Graeca in Urbani VIII. P. M. laudem. Panormi apud Angelum Orlandum 1623, in-fol.
- Valguarnera, Mariano (1795). Le Canzoni di Anacreonte tradotte dal greco in verso sciolto da Mariano Valguarnera (in Italian). Palermo: Reale Stamperia.
