= Sant'Antonio Abate, Palermo =

Church in Sicily, Italy

Sant'Antonio Abate
- Chiesa di Ecce Homo
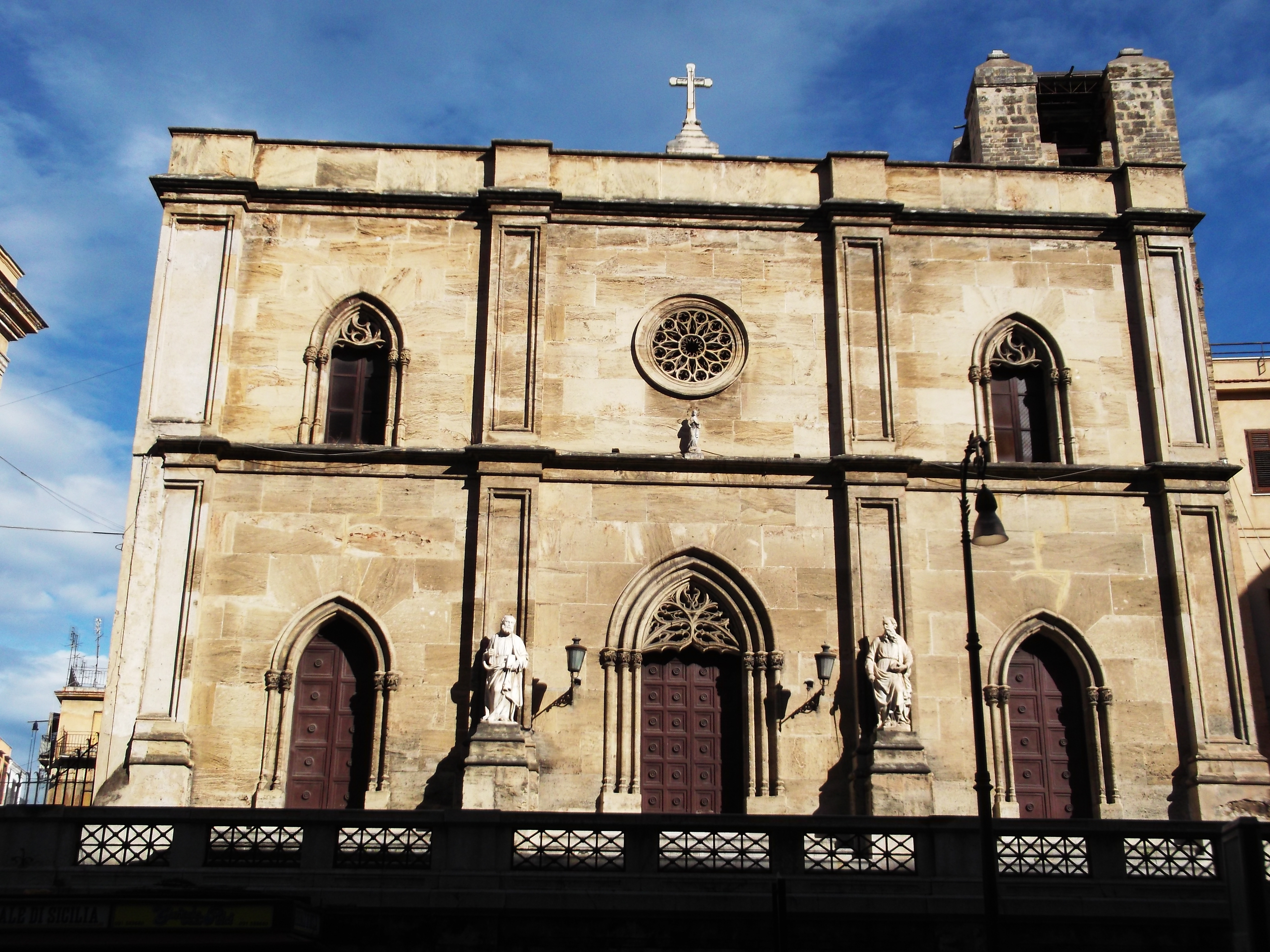
- Facade of Sant'Antonio Abate

Religion
- Affiliation: Roman Catholic
- Province: Archdiocese of Palermo
- Rite: Roman Rite

Location
- Location: Palermo, Italy
- Interactive map of Sant'Antonio Abate
- Coordinates: 38.11706°N 13.36347°E

Architecture
- Style: Sicilian Baroque
- Groundbreaking: 1640
- Completed: 1770

Website
- Official site

Sant'Antonio Abate (Saint Anthony the Abbot) is a Gothic-style Roman Catholic parish church located on Via Roma #203A in the ancient quarter of Castellammare, in central Palermo, region of Sicily, Italy. The church sits at the west corner of the Vucciria market.

== History ==
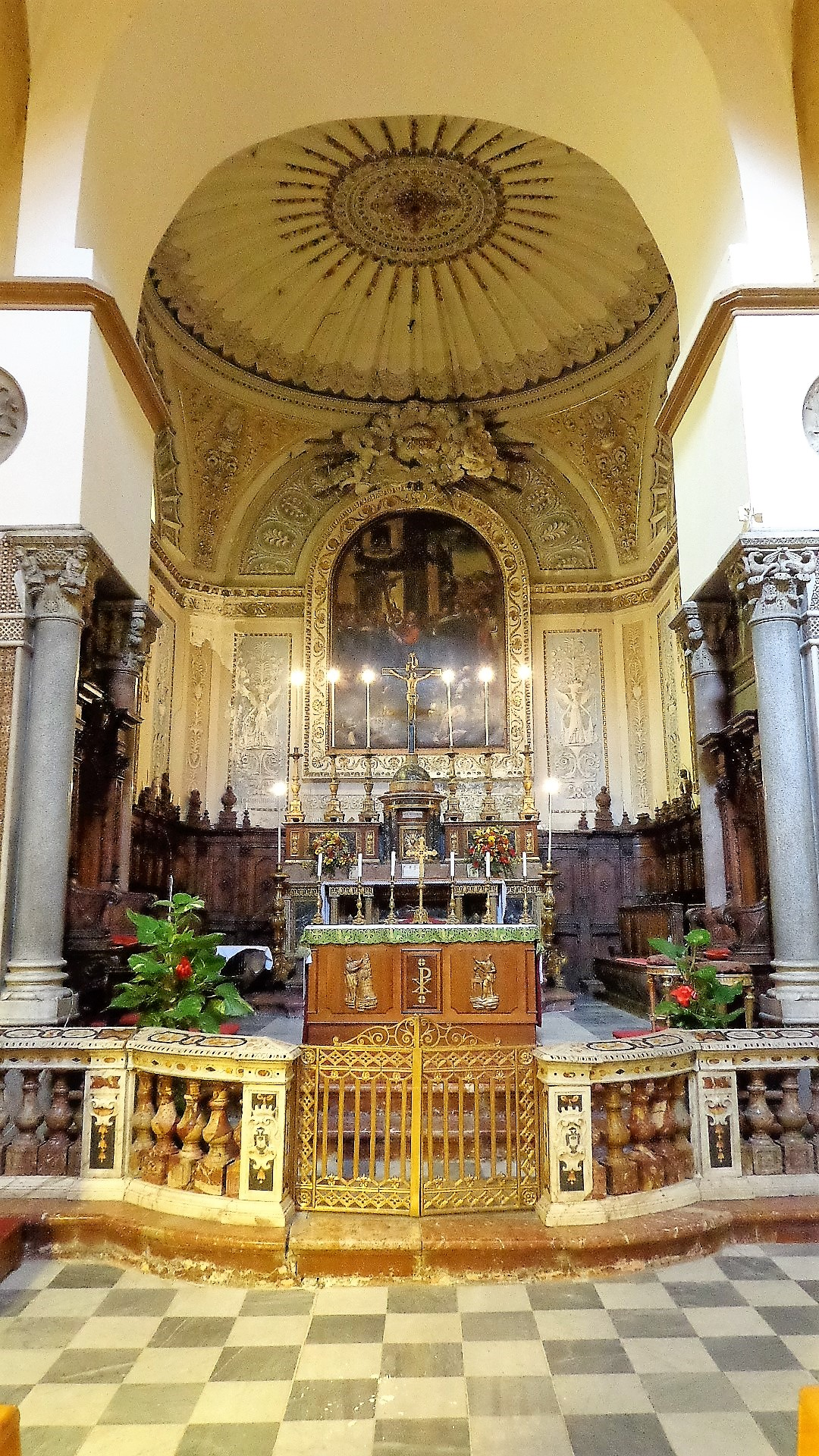
Interior towards Apse

A church at the site has been present since 1220. In that era, the building was adjacent to the medieval walls of the city and was near the confluence of two streams or rivers, the Kemonia and Papireto. The walls had tow towers, called Baych and Pharat built during the Muslim rule of Sicily as part of the walled defences of Palermo. There was a gate in the walls known as Bab al-bahr or sea gate in Arabic, because it led to the harbor. This gate was renamed Porta di Patitelli probably by the shoe-makers (known as patiti) who had their shops in the area. The gate and the tower of Baych were demolished to expand the street known as Cassaro Nuovo in 1567–68, while the tower of Pharat would later become the base of the bell tower of Sant'Antonio Abate. In the 16th century, entrance to the church-yard was located west of Via Roma in the area now comprising Piazzetta Marchese Arezzo.

Because the church has been reconstructed many times, it is unclear if the present facade would have been present in the 18th century. The church underwent a major refurbishment in 1823 after an earthquake. One modification present since the 18th century was the insertion of a wooden icon depicting the Christ devotion of Ecce Homo, a work attributed to Frate Umile from Petralia. The venerated icon is now displayed inside the church while a replica was installed in 1884 with the layout of the new via Roma. This icon is in a marble-and-glass box outside on the left wall. In 1733, the church that was already the parish of the Senate received the honor of proclaiming the Ecce Homo as the ordinary patron of the city.

The bell-tower was previously taller. It is said it was originally built by the Chiaramonte family in 1302 using as a base the tower of Pharat. The symbols of the Chiaramonte and the eagle of the Senate of Palermo are present on the western facade, while the symbols of the kings of Aragon are still visible in the eastern one. In 1595, fearing the danger of its collapse, the tower was shortened. The clock mechanism was destroyed in 1997 during an attempt at restoration. The bell was often used for civic announcements and to set the curfew.

In the 20th century the area in front of the church was uncluttered from buildings. The interior layout is that of a Greek Cross. The dome is held up by four granite columns, while the apse is delimited by eight columns with 14th-century capitals. The presbytery has two paintings depicting Christ and the adulteress and Christ and the Centurion (1757) by Gaspare Serenario. The main 17th-century altarpiece depicts San Carlo Borromeo in procession painted by Giuseppe Salerno. The baptismal font was sculpted in 1755 by Francesco Pennino based on a design by Ignazio Marabitti. In the left apse you can admire some marble reliefs depicting the Passion of Christ by Antonello Gagini.

At the top left and right on the pillars of the presbytery are two roundels depicting the Archangel Gabriel (left) and the Annunciation (right). In the apse on the right, is an altarpiece depicting St Antony Abbott by Giuseppe Salerno of the saint himself.

== See also ==
- 16th-century Western domes
