= Colonna dell'Immacolata, Palermo =

Sculpture in Palermo, Sicily

Colonna dell'Immacolata
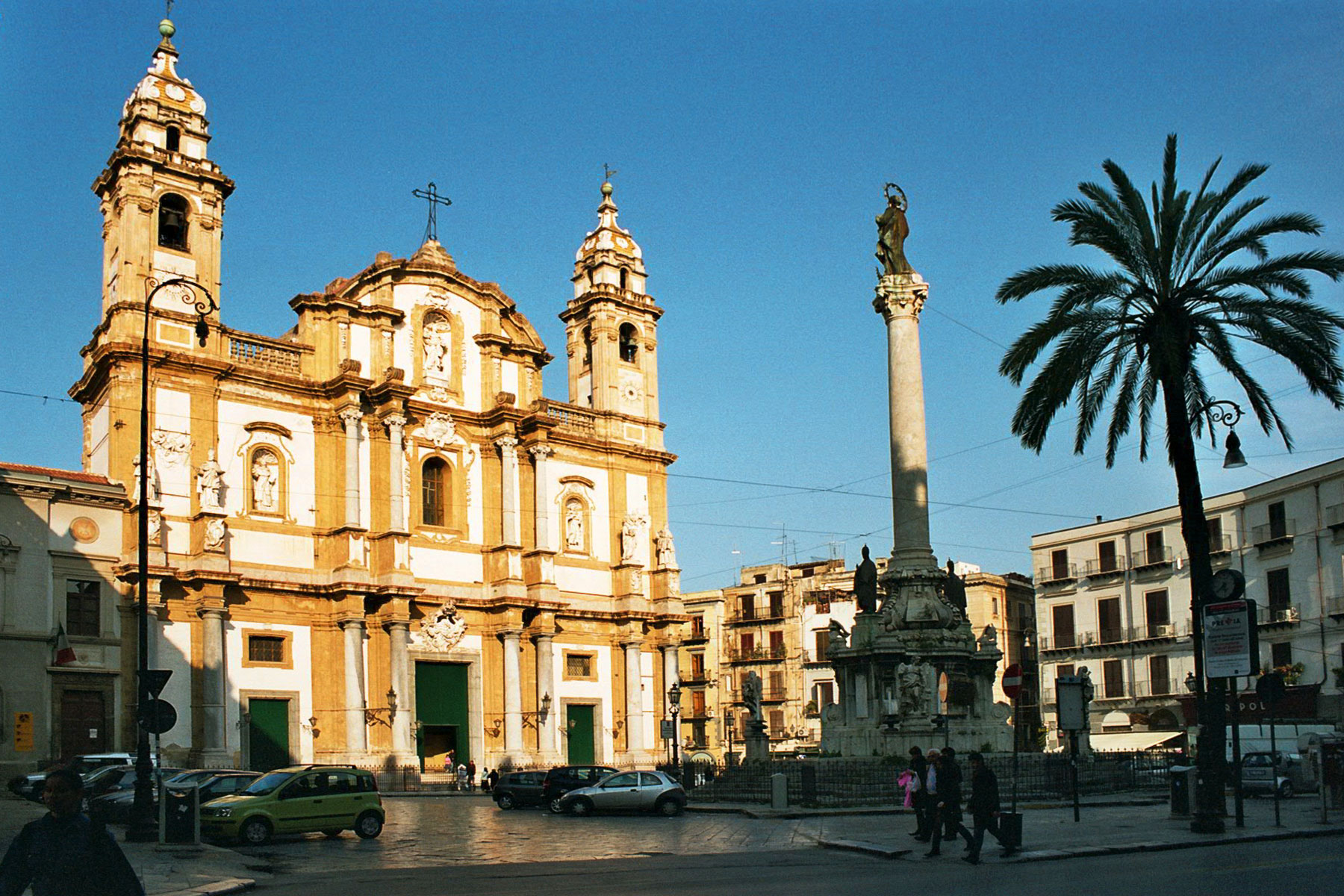
- Column on the right facing the facade
- 38°07′07″N 13°21′46″E
- Location: Piazza San Domenico, Palermo
- Material: Marble and bronze
- Dedicated to: Virgin of the Immaculate Conception

The Colonna dell'Immacolata Concezione is a monumental sculpture, whose centerpiece is a bronze statue of the Virgin of the Immaculate Conception atop a column, erected in 1631 on Piazza San Domenico in Palermo, Sicily. The monument, which stands in front of the church of San Domenico is also referred to as the Colonna di San Domenico or Monumento all'Immacolata. The 18th-century monument falls within the tradition for example, of the guglia or spire monuments common to Naples.

== History ==
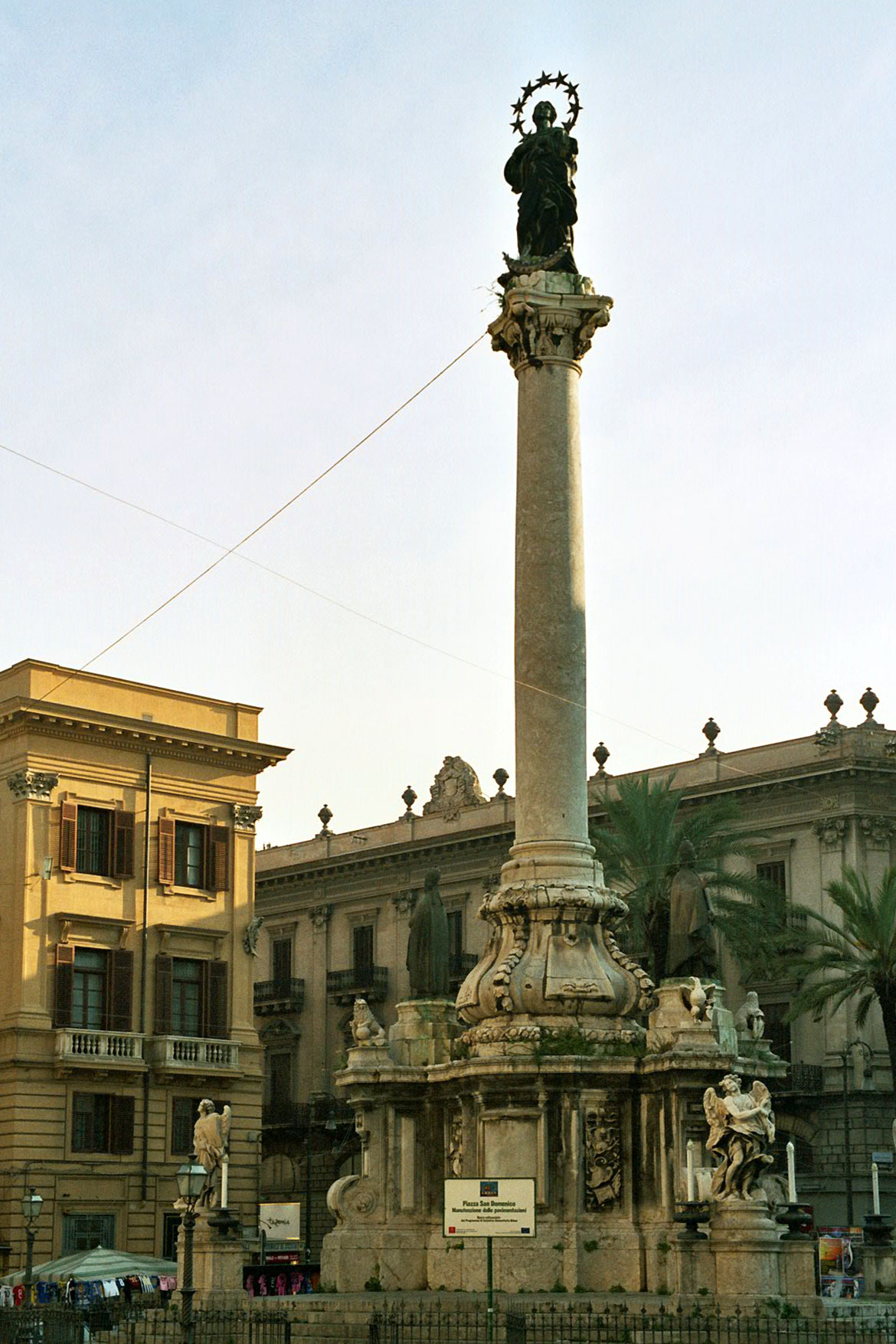
Column from the front

The work was commissioned during the rule of Sicily by King Charles VI of Naples, and designed by Tommaso Maria Napoli for this piazza, then known a Piazza Imperiale. Construction took place from 1724 to 1726, and was completed by Giovanni Amico.

Atop a plinth made with white Carrara marble is a column made from gray Billiemi marble. The column was shortened to allow for the priest to see the Madonna from the main altar through the large window on the main facade. Perched on the top of the column in the bronze statue of the Immaculate Conception, sculpted by Giovan Battista Ragusa. Bronze depictions of four archangels, Gabriel, Michael, Rafael and Uriele, are at the base of the monument.

Initially the plinth of the column also displayed bronze statues of Charles VI of Naples and his wife Elizabeth Christina of Brunswick. In 1750, these were switched for statues of Charles V of Naples and his wife Maria Amalia Walburga. After 1945, these were replaced by order of the then Cardinal and Archbishop of Palermo, Ernesto Ruffini, who replaced them with the still-present statues of Pius IX, who promulgated the dogma of the Immaculate Conception in 1864; and Pius XII, who promulgated the dogma of the Assumption of Mary in 1950.

The devotion to the Marian veneration of the Immaculate Conception, and its underlying assertion has thrived in Southern Italy. In 1624, the Senate of Palermo passed a decree vowing, with arms if necessary, to defend the dogma of the Immaculate Conception. In 1954, Cardinal Ruffino also started the tradition of having a fireman, using a fire-truck ladder to place a wreath of flowers at the feet of the Madonna. This replicates the ceremony established in 1953 in Rome for their Column of the Immaculate Conception in Piazza Mignanelli, towards the south east part of Piazza di Spagna.
