= Francesco Ferrara =

Italian politician, economist and statistician (1810–1900)

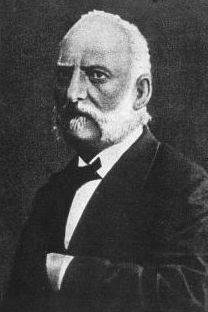

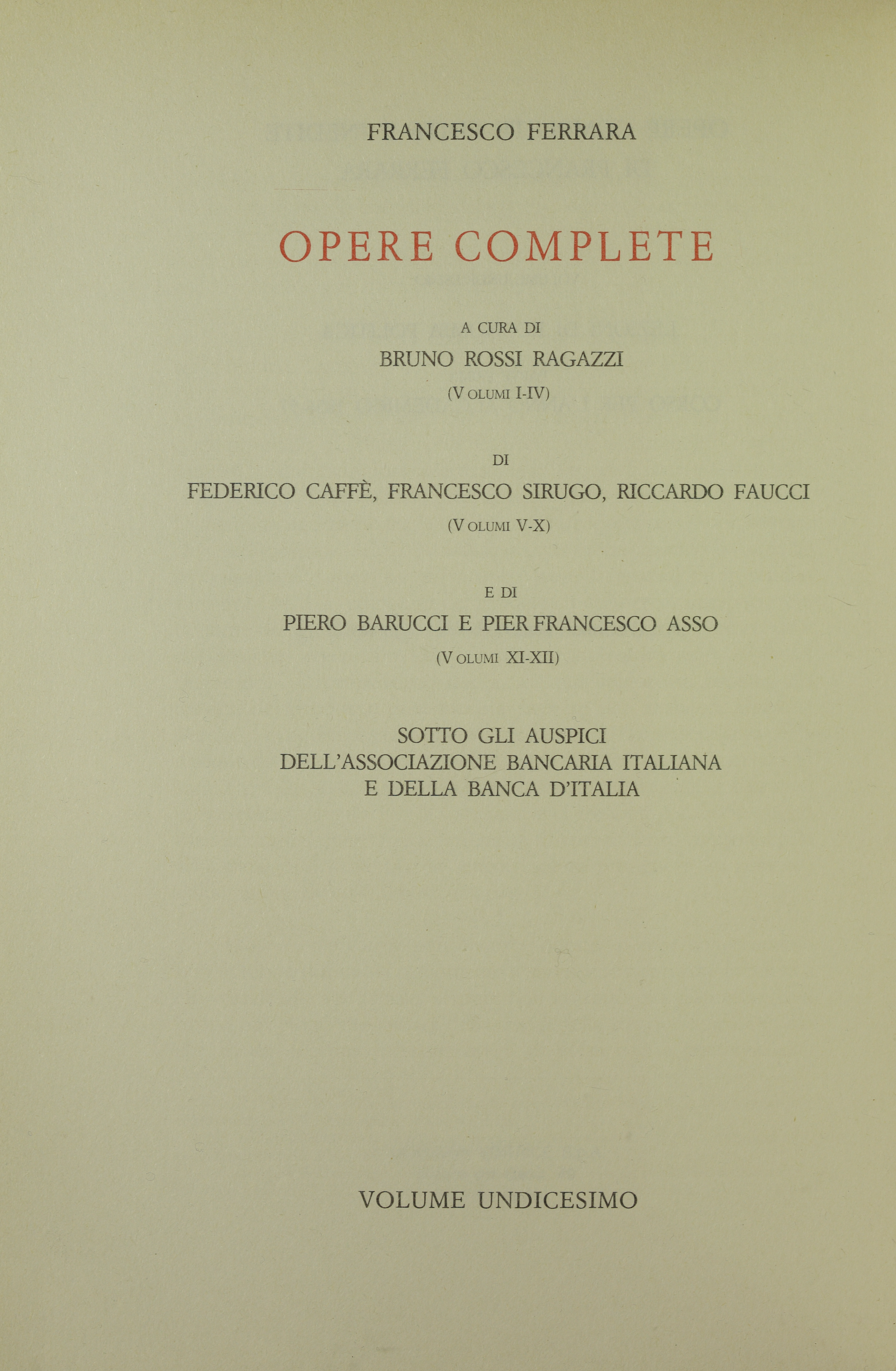
Lezioni di economia politica

Francesco Ferrara (1810–1900) was an Italian economist, and political scientist. He helped introduce the classical economic theories of Adam Smith, David Ricardo, and J. S. Mill into Italian scholarship. However, Ferrara was an early opponent of the Labour Theory of Value of Adam Smith, David Ricardo and James and J.S. Mill.
