= La Vucciria market =

Ancient market and neighborhood in Palermo, Italy

Coordinates: 38.1180°N 13.3649°E

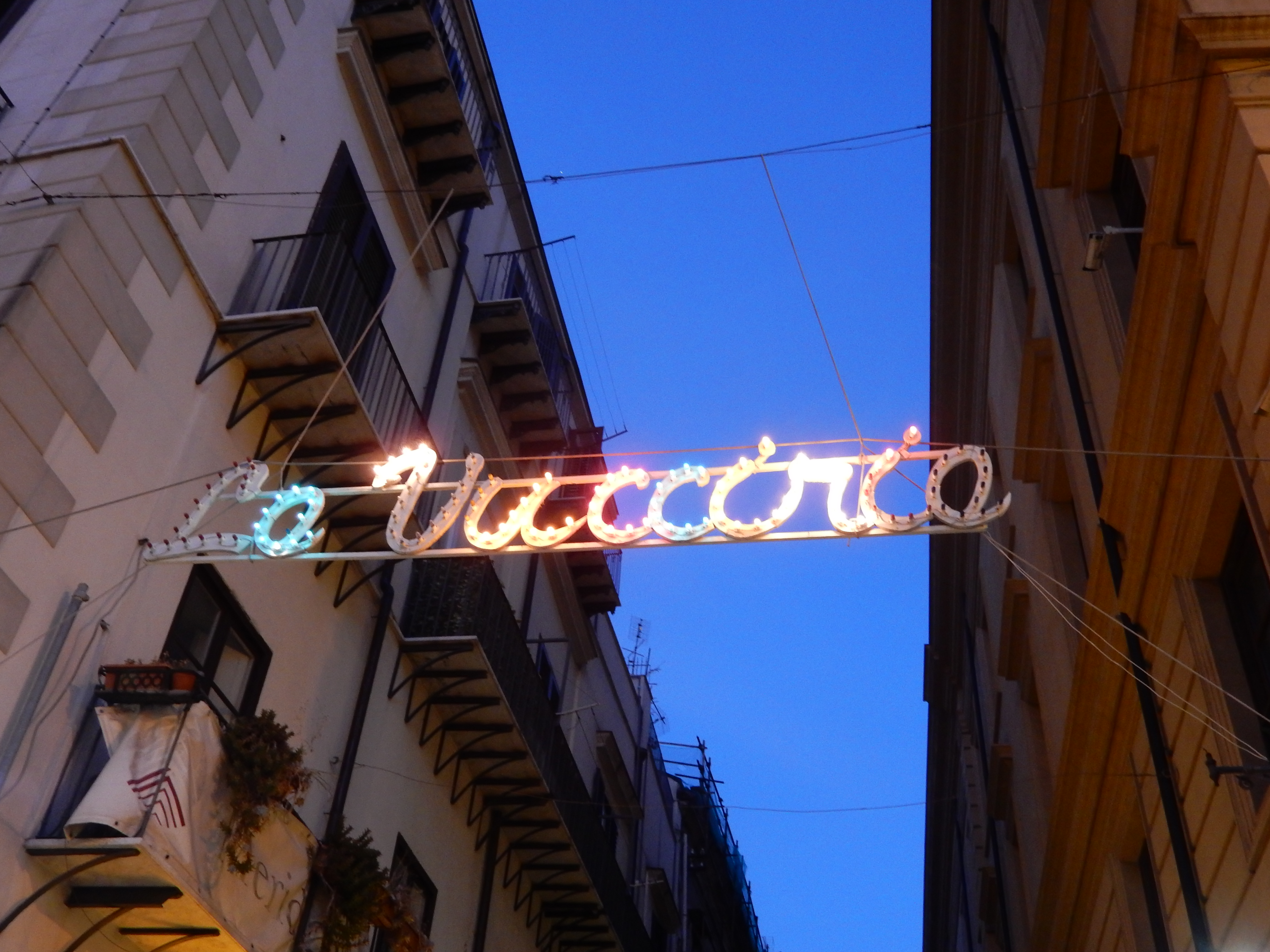
Ilumminated sign at one of the entrances

La or a Vuccirìa is an ancient, large market or bazaar area and neighborhood, with shops and tables selling products, produce, and foodstuffs located in the ancient quarter of Castellammare of central Palermo, region of Sicily, Italy. It consists of numerous pedestrian alleys and small piazzas in a crowded urban setting, is generally bounded to the North by the church and piazza of San Domenico, to the West by Via Roma, Palermo, and to the South by Via Vittorio Emanuele. Despite the dilapidated buildings and graffiti, the bustling spectacle of hawkers vociferously proffering their wares and the many food and drink establishments and dives, often open till late at night, are a draw for tourism in Palermo.

== History ==
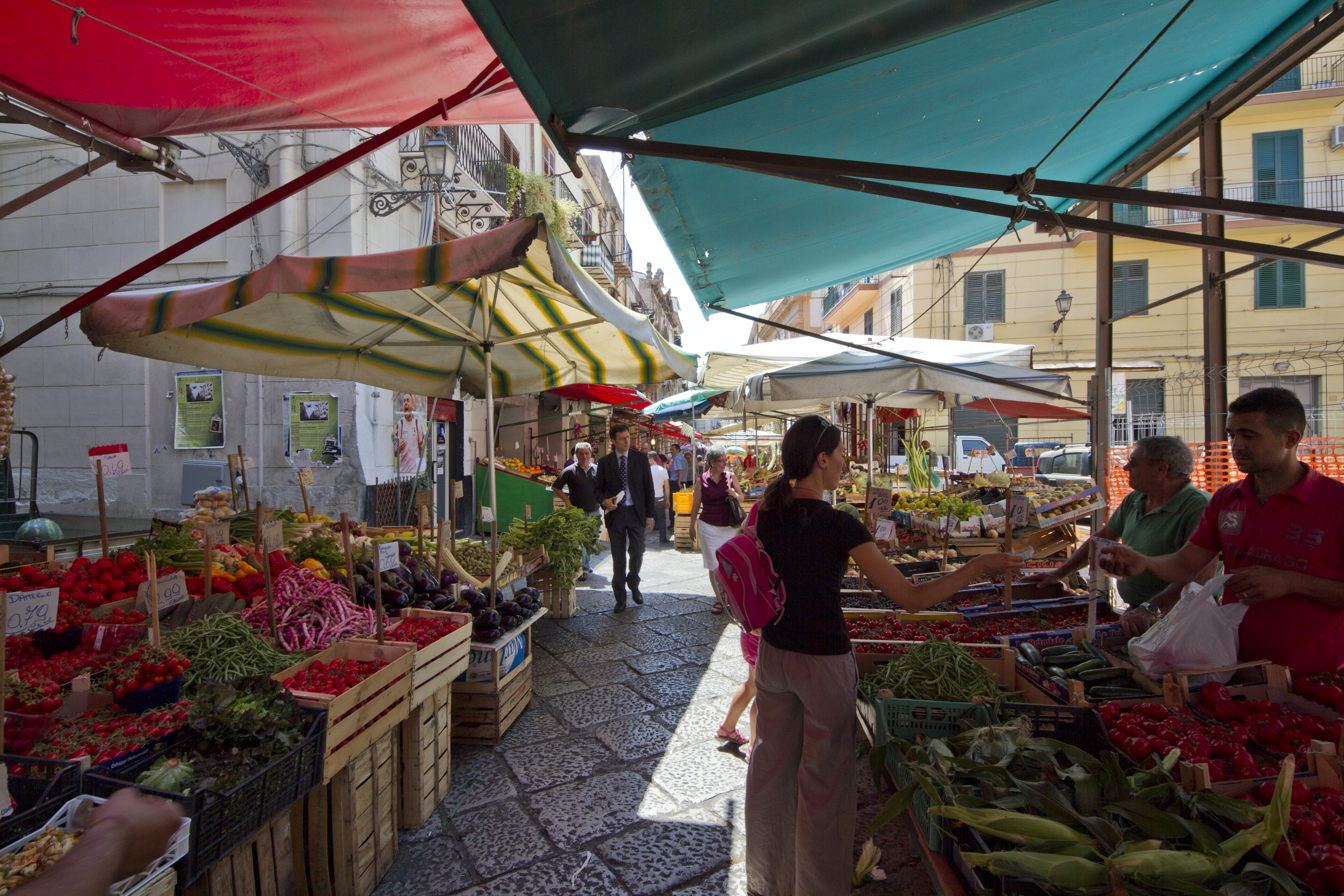

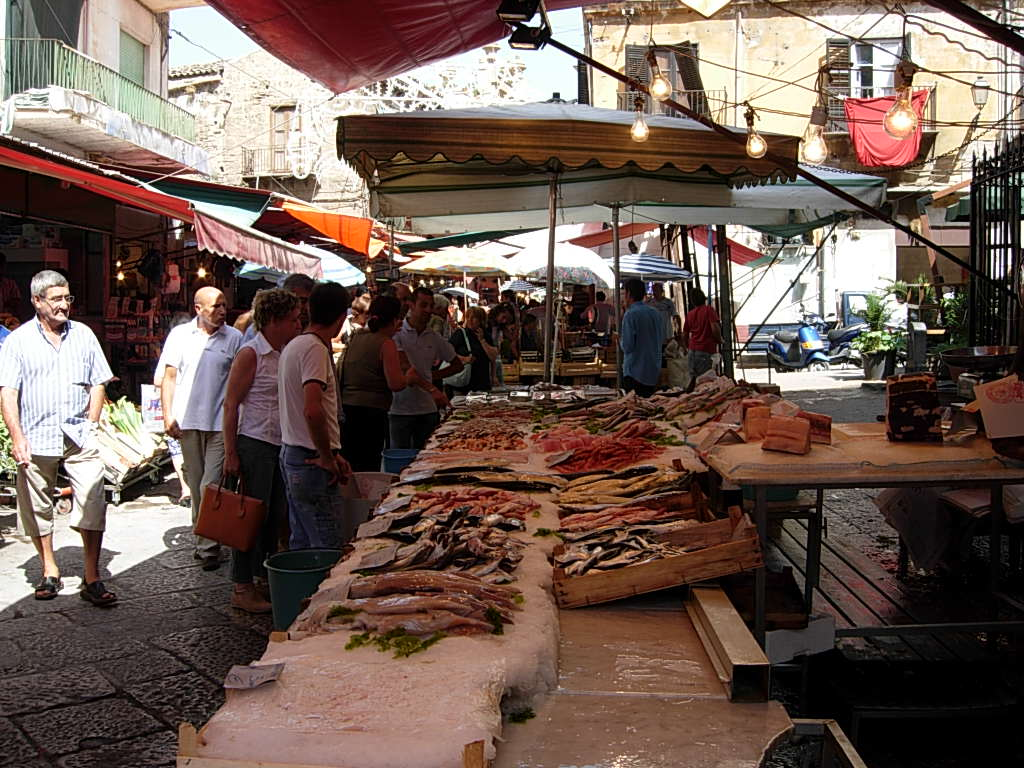

Like much in Palermo, the origins and etymology of Vucciria are murky. Some claim the name is allied to Voce, or voice, and refers to the loud hubbub and babble of merchants. Others claim the term is a colloquial butchery of the French word boucherie or butcher's shop. Just off Via Argenteria, in a small piazza front of the ruinous facade of the ancient church of Sant'Eulalia dei Catalani, is one of the oldest sculptural representation of the Genius of Palermo in the city. Initially, the Fontana del Garraffo stood in the space in front of the niche of the Genius, but was moved to the small tree lined Piazza Marina.

The area includes the Piazza Garraffello and Piazza Carraciolo. Other open-air market place in Palermo include the Mercato di Capo, Ballaro, Borgio Vecchio, and Piazza Peranni.
