= Railway network of Sicily =

Railway network in Sicily

Sicily's rail network, which has included only standard-gauge lines since 1986, is operated entirely by Rete Ferroviaria Italiana; an exception is the 111-km narrow-gauge Catania-Randazzo-Linguaglossa-Riposto line, which is operated by Ferrovia Circumetnea. As of 2018, the FS network in operation covers a length of 1369 km.

The Sicilian railways consist of 8 lines, spanning all nine provinces of the region. Many lines were decommissioned and generally dismantled, particularly in the 1960s (but even up to almost the threshold of the 1990s, decommissioning took place), mainly because they were uncompetitive in comparison with road transport, or because the needs for which they were created, such as the transport of sulfur extracted in large quantities in the mines in the center of the region, had ceased.

The Sicilian network constitutes the most extensive island rail network in the Mediterranean, but the routes have, by and large, remained original and circuitous, and modernization works during the 20th century have been very limited. It was only in the first decade of the 21st century that route modifications were planned and in some cases initiated to adapt them to transportation needs.

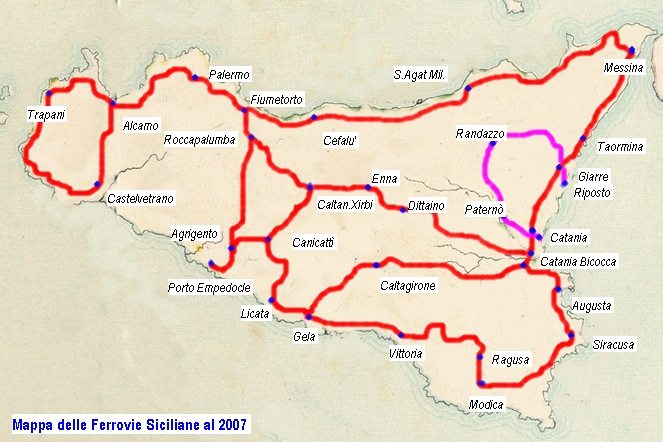
The rail network in operation in Sicily at the beginning of the 21st century. In red the RFI lines, in purple the FCE line.

== History ==
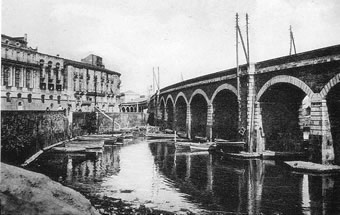
One of the earliest urban rail crossings in Catania: the Marina Arches

If the Kingdom of the Two Sicilies had the pride of having the first railroad in Italy, this was not the case for Sicily despite the fact that the exploitation of the island's sulfur had long since been undertaken. There were numerous instances from the various agricultural and industrial business sectors; in 1859 the Palermo entrepreneur Gaspare Ciprì had even founded a newspaper entitled Le ferrovie sicule and had undertaken negotiations with Belgian and Dutch investors for the possible establishment of a railway company that would build the routes afferent to the two ports most useful for the purpose, the Palermo-Bagheria (for the embarkation at the port of Palermo of sulfur from Lercara) and the Caltanissetta-Licata (for the embarkation at the port of Licata from that of Caltanissetta). A short time later the Institute for the Promotion of Agriculture, Arts and Crafts in Palermo announced a competition for the study of a rail network of Sicily; in this context a project that set as a priority the construction of the Palermo-Girgenti railroad with a branch line to Caltanissetta and Licata arose. With the proclamation of Giuseppe Garibaldi's Provisional Dictatorial Government all this fervor had immediate effect, and on 25 September 1860 a Convention was signed with the Adami and Lemmi Company formed by the bankers Pietro Augusto Adami and Adriano Lemmi of Livorno for the realization of the island's railroad network. Shortly afterwards, the newly formed Savoy government revoked the convention and transferred the concession deed to the Victor Emmanuel Railway (with predominantly French capital); nevertheless, the railways in Sicily were built late and slowly given the gradual insolvency and financial collapse in which the said company soon found itself. Even in the early 1870s, the mayor of Catania Tenerelli, a financier and entrepreneur in the sulfur industry, denounced the delay in the construction of the Palermo-Catania railway as the main reason for the crippling of the sulfur industry.

The first short section of a railway in Sicily was built in 1863 by engineer Francesco Durante Scimone, when tracks were laid between the capital and the nearby town of Bagheria. In 1866, however, construction of the second line (the busiest in the region) began: the Messina-Catania-Siracusa railway, fully activated in 1871, and completed in a much shorter time than the Palermo-Messina. The Palermo-Catania railroad opened in the same period made use of the original first section between Palermo and Bagheria and then penetrated into inland Sicily, stopping, however, at the station of Roccapalumba near the sulfur area of Lercara Friddi with the specific purpose of conveying mined ore to the port of Palermo; in 1869 the first section between Catania and Bicocca opened and by mid-1870 it was active as far as Pirato (Leonforte); this was the route that most interested sulfur industrialists because of the extensive mining basin of Grottacalda, Floristella and Sant'Agostino. Later, work extended to Enna and Santa Caterina Xirbi, joined in the summer of 1876, which were also affected by the railroad mainly because of the importance of the mining activities of the sulfur mines of Villarosa and Imera in inland Sicily; the Leonforte-Villarosa section in fact was built under subcontract by Robert Trewhella (the builder of the Ferrovia Circumetnea) also a major sulfur entrepreneur.

The construction of the coastal line between Licata and Syracuse, strongly advocated to attract goods to the port of Aretusa, was, however, quite late compared to the others and classified among the complementary lines to be built only with the contribution of local authorities. This was because the major interest of the mining entrepreneurs was to get sulfur to the coastal refineries of Porto Empedocle and Licata, seaports for the embarkation of the ore; the area around Caltanissetta and Canicattì had been connected since 24 September 1876, and later the connecting section up to Aragona Caldare joined the Palermo line (which crossed the other important mining basins of Comitini, Casteltermini and Lercara). By 1881 with the continuation on Licata the connection to the coast had finally been made.

The section from Syracuse to Noto was only activated by the Società per le Strade Ferrate della Sicilia, the new concessionary company, on 5 April 1886. It still waited until 1891 for Licata to be connected with Gela, at that time Terranova di Sicilia, and on 23 December 1891 the Noto-Modica section of the line was also opened for operation. And two years later, in 1893 the Terranova di Sicilia - Comiso section and the Comiso-Modica, which completed the Syracuse-Licata railway, were inaugurated on June 18 of the same year.

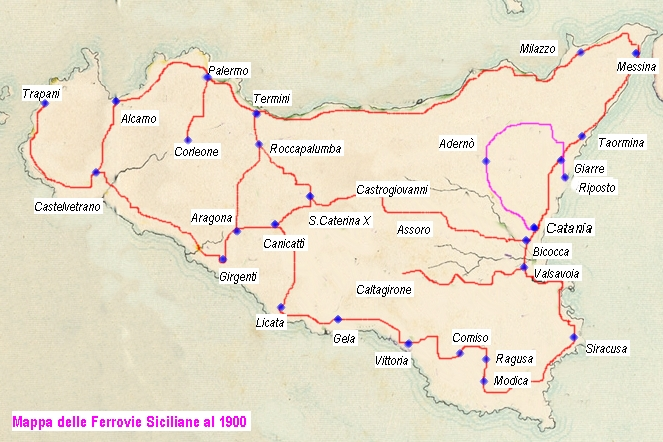
Sicilian railways in the early 20th century

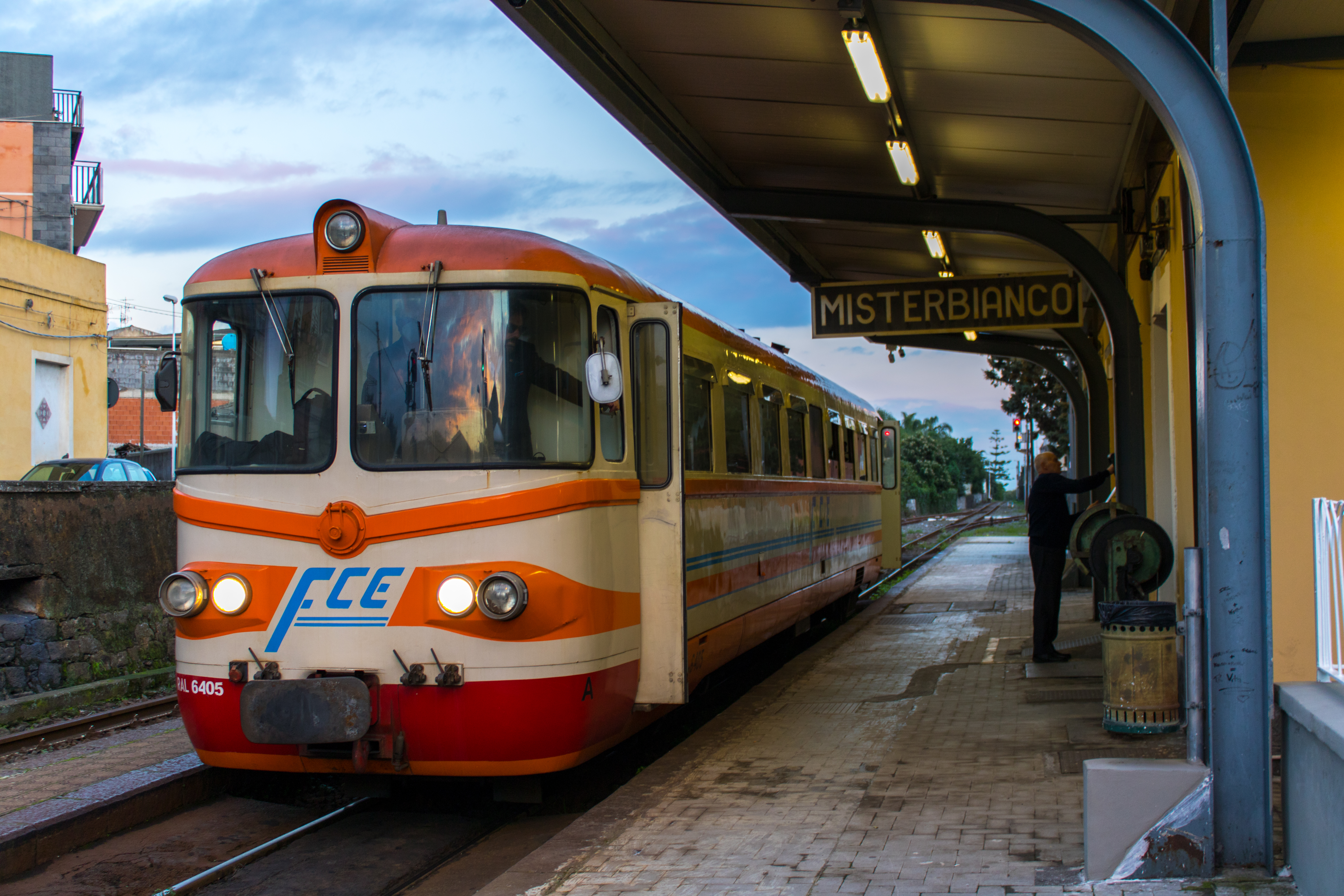
The Circumetnea Railway, opened in 1898 on the slopes of Mount Etna.

From the capital, at the beginning the first radiating hub of Sicilian railroads, it was not until 1880 that the first sections of the line to Trapani began to open by the Western Sicilian Railway Company, which was joined six years later by the longer Castelvetrano route. In 1892 the line to Caltagirone from the Etnean capital was also completed, however, it was not until 1931 that this locality was connected to the station of Dittaino, near Enna, (but on a narrow gauge) and it was necessary to wait a good half century, that is, until 1979, for the continuation of the line to Gela to come into operation, which would probably never have been connected to the Catania-Caltagirone line without the emergence of the Gela petrochemical hub. Instead, the direct connection between Caltagirone and Canicattì, which would have shortened the distance between Catania and Agrigento, remained unfinished, although much of the work had already been completed.

Also in Catania, the Circumetnea railway, which with its tracks encircles the enormous massif of Mount Etna at its base, was completed in 1898; however, In the initial plans it had been clamored for the line to reach even the towns to the north of the province of Enna, which instead remained without railroads. By the time the picturesque Catania-Motta Sant'Anastasia-Regalbuto railway was finally completed in the 1950s, it was too late for the purposes for which it had been designed, but nevertheless it was intensively used until the 1970s to transport oranges from Leto, Mandarano, Carcaci (in the territory of Centuripe) Schettino and Paternò; from the early 1970s, however, citrus fruits were gradually transported in other ways, and the line was decommissioned after a few decades. Preliminary plans, again, envisioned the continuation of the line as far as Leonforte and Nicosia, from where it would cross the Madonie Mountains, disgorging in the direction of Termini Imerese, on the Tyrrhenian Sea, so that the Ennese area, with its large sulfur basins in Catania and Palermo, could be more quickly connected, and above all to reduce the problem of the excessive gradient of the Misericordia pass in Enna, which reached as much as 32 per thousand; the line, on the other hand, was designed with a maximum gradient of 21 per thousand. This time the projects were not completed either (despite the fact that the route up to Nicosia had already been built) due to the lesser interest in developing rail transport in the region, as the investment of high financial resources for crossing mountainous territories such as the Erean Mountains and the even more inaccessible Madonie Mountains was not considered justified.

The old idea was taken up, in principle, in the early 2000s by an RFI SpA project for the construction of a new Messina-Catania-Palermo high-speed/high-capacity carrier axis using part of the historic Catania-Palermo route, (with the necessary adjustments and doubled), from Catania Bicocca Station to Catenanuova-Centuripe Station, then pointing towards the Erean Mountains in the direction of Regalbuto and with a series of tunnels for a total of 39 km, and crossing the last offshoots of the Nebrodi Mountains until reaching the Messina-Palermo coastal line at Castelbuono, just before Cefalù. Such a route was expected to drastically cut down the connection time between the two metropolitan cities but triggered controversy from Enna and Caltanissetta institutions that preferred a line that would penetrate as far as both cities by retracing a merely modernized version of the current route. The two cities at the time of the railroad's construction were joined mainly because of the richness of their sulfur basins; following the abandonment of ore mining since the late 1960s, rail freight became marginal, both because of market crises and, since the late 1980s, as a result of the FS's decision to abandon small batch transport in favor of full train. Diverting the route planned for the A.V. line with stops in the two cities, however, would totally nullify its construction given that stops below 100 km would drastically lower the commercial speed.

== Network extension ==
The Sicilian railroad network, which was largely created in the 70 years between the Unification of Italy and the first decade of Mussolini's government, underwent little change since then until after World War II when, especially with the so-called Scalfaro decree, the disposal of some lines that were deemed too costly in terms of the ratio of revenue to yield began despite the fact that they served, sometimes as the only link, the local populations of inland areas. A second wave of disposals in more recent times occurred as a result of the so-called stately decree. In 2008, the network was paradoxically configured to resemble that of the early 20th century, with slightly less extension, but in 2010 additional rail routes were suspended and uncertainty remains about the fate of important lines such as the Syracuse-Gela-Canicattì and the Alcamo-Castelvetrano-Trapani.

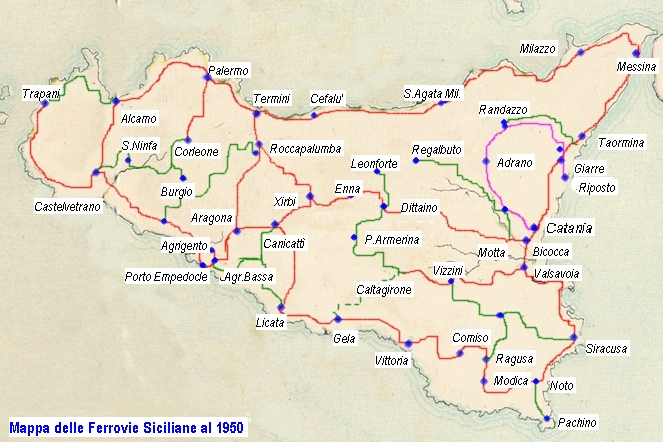
Extension of the Sicilian railway network as of 1950

The most important lines in the present-day network are: the Tyrrhenian, between Messina and Palermo to which the extension on the Punta Raisi Airport and to Trapani is attached westward; and the Ionian, between Messina, Catania and Syracuse; the central Sicilian, in the interior, between Palermo and Catania via Caltanissetta and Enna completes the picture. The inland transversal between Palermo and Agrigento is being upgraded and speeded up, and to a lesser extent the one between Catania and Gela. However, there are also lines of more limitedly local and commuter function such as the Alcamo-Castelvetrano-Trapani and the southern Syracuse-Ragusa-Gela-Canicattì which, although they pass through many important areas and production centers, do not seem to be given much consideration. Notable among these is the Circumetnea railway, a rail line with suburban and metropolitan functions.

=== The Tyrrhenian backbone ===
The line involves the two urban hubs of Palermo and Messina around which the major commuter traffic takes place and also allows the city of Trapani to be reached via Trapani railway station; it is called Tyrrhenian because it faithfully follows the coastline of the Tyrrhenian Sea on the northern side of the region. The union of the two lines Palermo-Messina and Palermo-Trapani entirely covers the Tyrrhenian side of Sicily.

The Tyrrhenian Palermo-Messina was fully inaugurated in 1895, replacing the very long previous route that, from Palermo, passed through Aragona, Caltanissetta, Enna, and Catania before finally reaching Messina. The line slavishly follows the Tyrrhenian coast for most of the route as a result of the difficult topography of the area, in many cases with a steep coastline and overhanging into the sea, without penetrating inland except in a few cases. Doubling has been under construction for many years with very significant costs given the need for considerable artwork with moving the route further inland. The line, which measures 213 km, is still largely single-track with rather low track speeds for much of the route. Until the 1990s, in order to pass the Peloritani Pass near Messina, it was necessary for trains of higher composition to be pushed to the rear with a decoupleable mesh locomotive; when traction was still steam-powered, that is, until the 1950s, this caused quite a few health problems for the tail-end drivers because of the smoke that accumulated in the tunnel. In May 1951, electric traction operation began on the Peloritan side of the city; electrification work reached the Sicilian capital in 1955. During the following years the sections near the two cities were doubled and finally with the activation of the Peloritan Tunnel eliminated the push service to heavy trains. In the past the line had an increase in freight traffic to support the industrial activities of Palermo and the FIAT plant in Termini Imerese even though it was penalized by the single track and the amount of crossings and headways due to the coexisting passenger traffic. The general crisis of the 2000s drastically reduced this traffic.

The backbone is supplemented by the 125-km-long Palermo-Trapani, from which branches off the important branch (of 14 km) to Palermo-Punta Raisi Airport. The line enters the Trapani plain, cutting sharply through the tip of San Vito Lo Capo to reach Trapani from which it can continue to Marsala, Mazara del Vallo and Castelvetrano. The line speed is around 80–90 km/h, with considerable gradients (19 per mille) around Partinico.

=== The Ionian backbone ===
The Ionian is the second major line in the region. It is 182 km long from central Messina to Syracuse. It was the first line in the region to be built in its entirety between 1867 and 1871, with the present layout except for the modern double-track variant sections between Fiumefreddo and Catania and between central Messina and Giampilieri. Elegant 625 locomotives and some of Italy's most impressive steam locomotives, such as the 746 and 480, ALn 56 Fiat railcars, and ALn 772, among others, ran on this line. In the late postwar period, with electrification, E.636, E.626 locomotives and Ale 840 railcars arrived, supplemented from the mid-1970s also by E.646 and later E.656. The line also saw the presence of ALe 601s, which operated the "Peloritano" express train to Roma Termini.

All categories of trains run on the Ionian line, except for high-speed ones, and at one time also many agency trains of a tourist nature. However, traffic is affected by the presence of the long single-track section in the central part. The line begins double-track from central Messina to Giampilieri from where it becomes single-track; from here and as far as Taormina it passes through densely inhabited areas and alternates between sections in the open and in tunnels; the line penetrates further, continuing on Giarre (where there is a connection with the FCE) and Acireale becoming double-track again shortly after the station of Fiumefreddo di Sicilia and up to the entrance of Catania; the Acireale section is, since the 1980s, almost entirely in tunnels following the construction of the double track. The section of the line through Catania is currently being buried with work scheduled for completion in 2016. From Catania's Acquicella station it runs alongside the double-track Fontanarossa airport, which, however, ends as early as Bicocca; it becomes single-track again, crossing almost uninterrupted citrus groves and coastal stretches as far as Augusta; after the long, almost straight section passing through the Priolo petrochemical plant, it becomes double-track again at Targia as far as Siracusa, which has been transformed into a head station for some years now.

=== The backbone of central Sicily ===
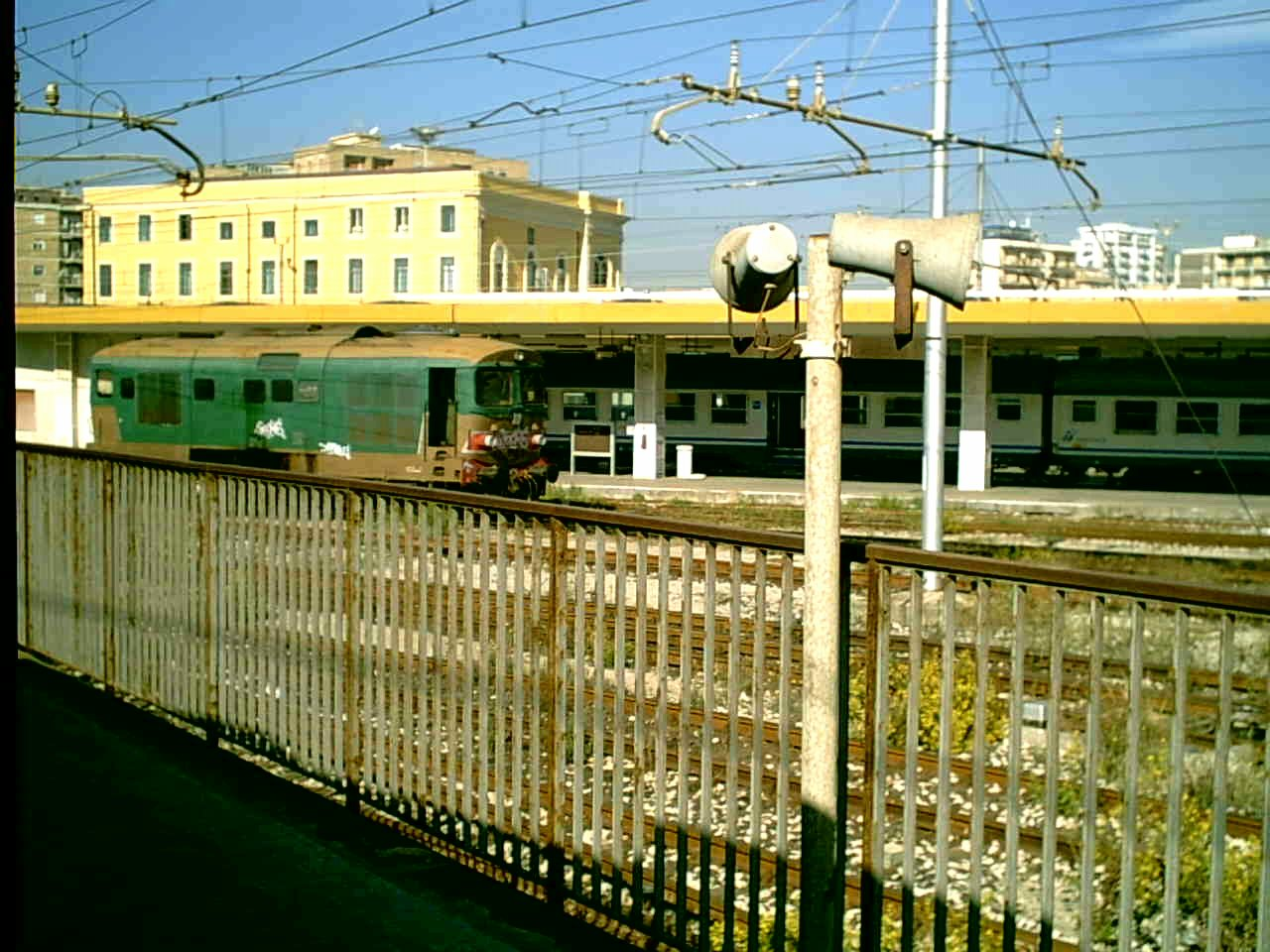
Catania Centrale station, seen in 2004 from the FS stop of the Catania Metro, which was discontinued in 2016.

The central Sicilian backbone that began in 1863 with the Palermo-Bagheria was completed in 1885, with the opening of the Marianopoli tunnel that allowed direct trains between Palermo and Catania to take the so-called Vallelunga line, avoiding the long round trip of the one, opened in 1881, that ran from Roccapalumba to Aragona-Caldare (on the outskirts of Agrigento, then Girgenti) and then up to Canicattì and Caltanissetta Xirbi (then Santa Caterina Xirbi). The construction period of more than 20 years can be explained by the topographical difficulties of the stretches of land crossed, as well as by the length of the line, about 240 km, which passes through the inland provincial capitals, Enna and Caltanissetta. Initially, when it was built it was a connection on Lercara and later for Girgenti because the primary interest was mainly in getting sulfur from the inland basins of Sicily to the ports of Palermo or Porto Empedocle. Only later did the opportunity to connect the aforementioned line more concretely to the one already built coming from Catania emerge.

Trains from Palermo, having arrived at Roccapalumba for the most part go toward Agrigento, while some continue to Caltanissetta and Catania through a long series of sparsely man-made valleys and hills and the long Marianopoli Tunnel that heralds the arrival at the Caltanissetta Xirbi Station. From Xirbi, the railway route for Canicattì and Agrigento detaches.

The railroad continues to the Villarosa Station, once an important sulfur depot and since 8 December 1995 the site of an interesting Railway Museum, of mining art and rural culture, set up entirely aboard vintage wagons. Then begins the hard climb to Enna that required double or triple pulling in the days of steam when the line was still among the most important in Sicily. After the long Misericordia Tunnel, the line reaches Enna Station, a passenger stop of a certain importance, after which the line descends again toward the Dittaino Valley to the 280 m above sea level of Dittaino Station, which serves the Enna Industrial Hub. The line continues downhill through arable fields and citrus groves to Catenanuova and beyond through the Plain of Catania; the proximity to the Etnean capital is made tangible by the sight of the industrial settlements and the airport.

The line had relevance from its inception because it connected the three major urban centers of Palermo, Catania and Messina. Also because it was functional for mining transport from the sulfur mines of Caltanissetta, Villarosa and the Enna area (including the important ones of Floristella and Grottacalda) to the embarkation ports. The importance of the line for freight traffic waned until the 1970s following the systematic closure of the mines and especially the opening of the A19 highway, which was more competitive for passenger connections between the two extreme locations.

The railroad has modest commuter traffic between Enna and Caltanissetta, and between them and Catania, and despite modernizations and the use of modern circulation systems it records low standards of utilization in place, with little supply of passenger trains and few freight trains.

Since the beginning of the 2000s, an upgrading project with relevant structural changes to the line has been slowly materializing, starting with the first section Bicocca - Catenanuova with a view to future upgrading and development of the railway network in central and eastern Sicily. The Palermo-Catania-Messina railway axis is included in the works envisaged by the Sblocca Italia decree, which allocated 816 million out of the 8,000 million needed for the entire work according to government estimates.

In 2017, the approval of the final project, signed by Maurizio Gentile, CEO and general manager of Rete Ferroviaria Italiana, resulted in the tendering of the doubling and speeding of the Bicocca - Catenanuova lot. The track design calls for a maximum commercial speed of up to 200 km/h. The call for tenders for the executive design and construction work was published in the Official Journal of the European Union and on RFI's procurement portal for a base bid amount of 220 million euros. The tender is expected to be concluded by the end of 2017. The intervention consists of the construction of the double-track line between Bicocca and Catenanuova (about 37 km); part of the route runs alongside the existing line, and part is a variant. It is scheduled for completion in 2022. One of the two new tracks will be activated in 2020.

=== Minor inland lines ===
The network, which can be defined as minor because of its narrow gauge, developed as an extension and complement to two main lines: the north-south transversal Palermo-Corleone-San Carlo and the longitudinal coastal Castelvetrano-Porto Empedocle. Most of the others stood at intermediate or terminal stations of the first two. Exceptions were the lines in the central hinterland that arose in support of the Palermo-Catania.

=== Lines in concession ===
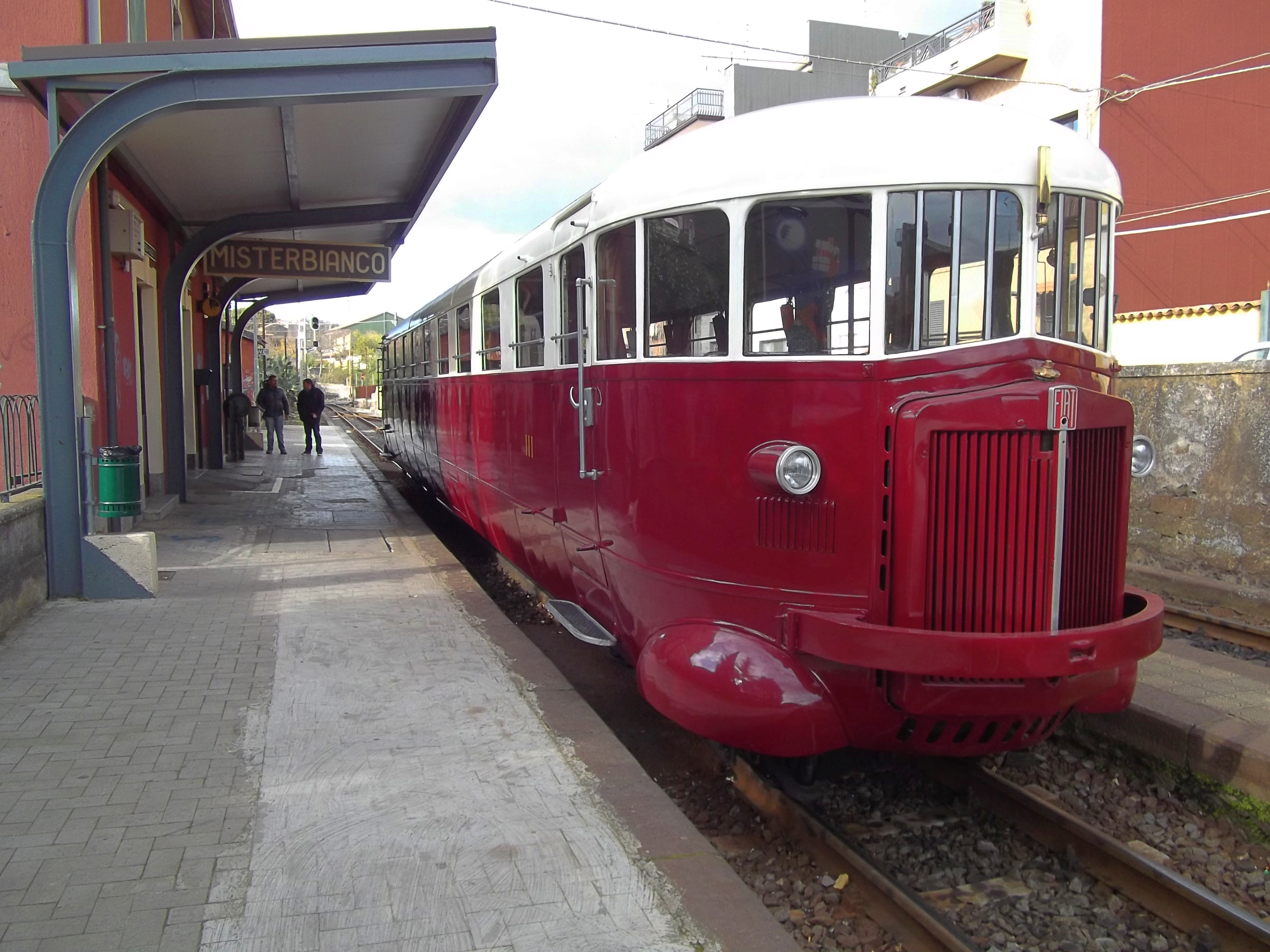
The railcar ALn 56.06 (series ALn 56.01-06), built by Fiat Ferroviaria, of the Circumetnea Railway, restored for the provision of tourist and amateur trains on request.

Of the Sicilian railways in concession only one has survived the cuts and closures; the Ferrovia Circumetnea, which has shown constant vitality and despite experiencing periods of great difficulty has been moving, since the threshold of the 2000s, toward adaptation to metropolitan and tourist traffic with further network expansion projects.

The other line, the Syracuse-Ragusa-Vizzini Railroad, which ran through the Anapo Valley, was closed and dismantled in the late 1950s despite representing, if upgraded, the shortest link between Ragusa and Catania and a valuable means of tourist transportation to Pantalica.

== Network characteristics ==
The Sicilian railways, while still quite extensive are, except for a few newly built sections near the areas of the three largest Sicilian cities, generally of obsolete design and layout and therefore inadequate to the changing economic needs of the Sicilian territory. The closure of more than 700 km of lines since the 1950s has not resulted in the design and construction of new tracks, leaving the areas of central and southwestern Sicily without rail connections: the southern area of the province of Enna, of great tourist-archaeological interest, and the coast from Castelvetrano to Agrigento and Licata, in which there are important archaeological areas, such as Selinunte, Eraclea Minoa and Agrigento, and cities such as Sciacca, Ribera, Castelvetrano and Porto Empedocle.

=== Electrification and track doubling ===
The majority of the network is single-track (1146 km), and 791 km of it has been electrified. The extent of electrified double-track lines is 223 km. The thermal traction lines total 578 km.

=== Obsolescence and failure to upgrade the Sicilian lines ===
Sicily's railroads, all or most of which were designed or date back to the second half of the nineteenth century, of which some were even built or started only during the twenty-year period of Fascist rule, such as the Motta Sant'Anastasia-Regalbuto and the Alcantara-Randazzo, have undergone few and limited upgrading works and some have been abandoned to their own devices, condemning them to irreversible obsolescence. Since the 1980s, only a few rail sections afferent to the island's major cities have been built, such as the branch line to Punta Raisi airport and some doubling of the main single-track network, such as the one between Messina and Patti, and between Targia and Syracuse. Modernizations of the nodes around the island's two largest cities have been built slowly and still seem far from being completed. The last railway line to be built and completed, in 1979, was the Caltagirone - Gela. However, plans dated back to the 1920s and some of the work had already been done before the war. Many works executed or started were finally abandoned in the 1950s such as the continuation towards Palermo of the Regalbuto - Nicosia section or the Canicattì - Caltagirone. At present, the regional network would need a profound redesign of the routes according to new mobility needs, and the connection with, and between, airports and intermodal freight transport.

=== Control and security technologies ===
According to official RFI data, as of 2017, traffic remote control systems (SCC/CTC+DPC) are operated on a total of 1340 km.

Traffic safety is ensured by the presence of:

- SCMT, for train running control installed on 901 km;
- SSC, for guidance support operating on 468 km.

=== Vehicles in operation and travel speed ===
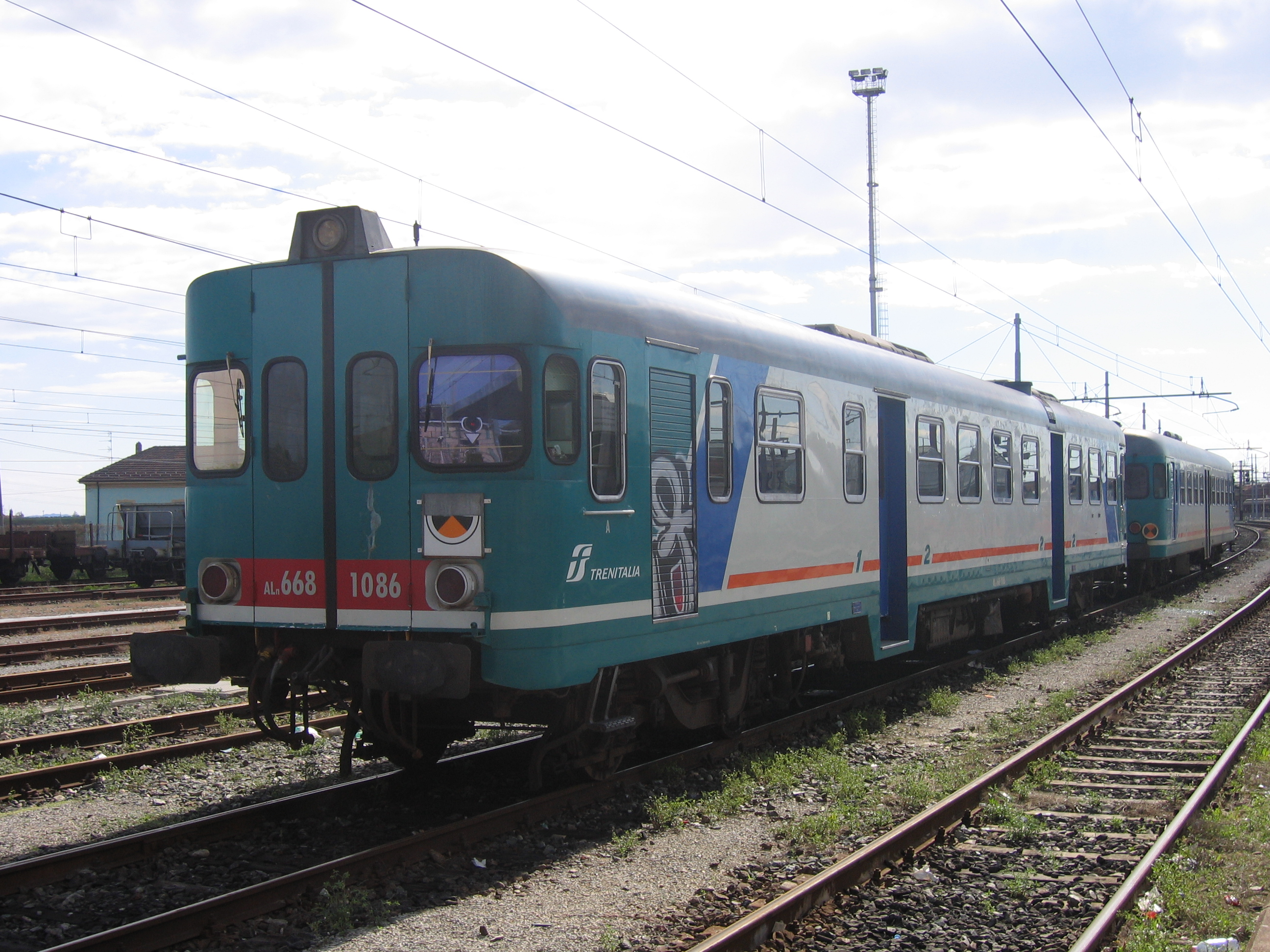
A pair of ALn 668 series railcars: a constant presence on Sicily's inland lines.

The vehicles running on Sicily's railways underwent some renewal during the 1970s when the State Railways replaced most of the steam locomotives with modern diesel locomotives and also introduced railcars of the ALn 668 type in place of antiquated rolling stock. Thereafter, however, there has often been only a recycling of rolling stock, much of it from north-central railways, where it was redundant due to the arrival of the latest generation high-speed vehicles.

As of 22 November 2009, between Messina and Patti on the Palermo-Messina, speeds of up to 220 km/h can be reached, while 150 km/h maximum speeds remain attainable only on two short sections of the Messina-Catania and near Palermo. On the rest of the lines, the maximum speeds that can be reached, only on a few occasions, exceed 120 km/h; they remain, for the most part, within and below 100 km/h, with long internal stretches at only 75/80 km/h.

It must be considered that the hydrogeological disruption conditions of Sicily often cause landslides, clearly visible to those who travel the network of state and provincial roads where they cause severe unevenness of the road surface to be traveled at walking pace. On the railroad network, whose road surface is, in many cases, still that of the last century with embankments in poor condition and never resolved ballast drainage problems, such events often cause traffic disruptions or in less severe cases slowdowns that disrupt the regularity of train travel. (The heavy costs of ongoing rehabilitation work, eventually globally outweighing those of any modernization, contributed to the decision to close the extensive FS narrow-gauge network.)

=== Slopes ===
The harsh terrain of Sicily meant that many lines were built with steep inclines to keep costs down. The maximum slope reaches a level of 31 per thousand on the ramps leading to Enna and 30 per thousand from lower Agrigento to Aragona, and on the ramps of the line between Modica and Ragusa. The other lines have smaller gradients, ranging from 22 per thousand near Castelvetrano on the Palermo-Trapani, to 16 per thousand between Lentini and Syracuse on the Messina-Siracusa. The Dittaino-Piazza Armerina-Caltagirone railroad, no longer in existence had many rack and pinion sections to deal with the very steep gradients, up to 75 per thousand between Mulinello and Valguarnera Caropepe and 35 per thousand between Caltagirone and Piazza Armerina. On the Circumetnea Railway, gradients reach 40 per thousand.

== Traffic ==
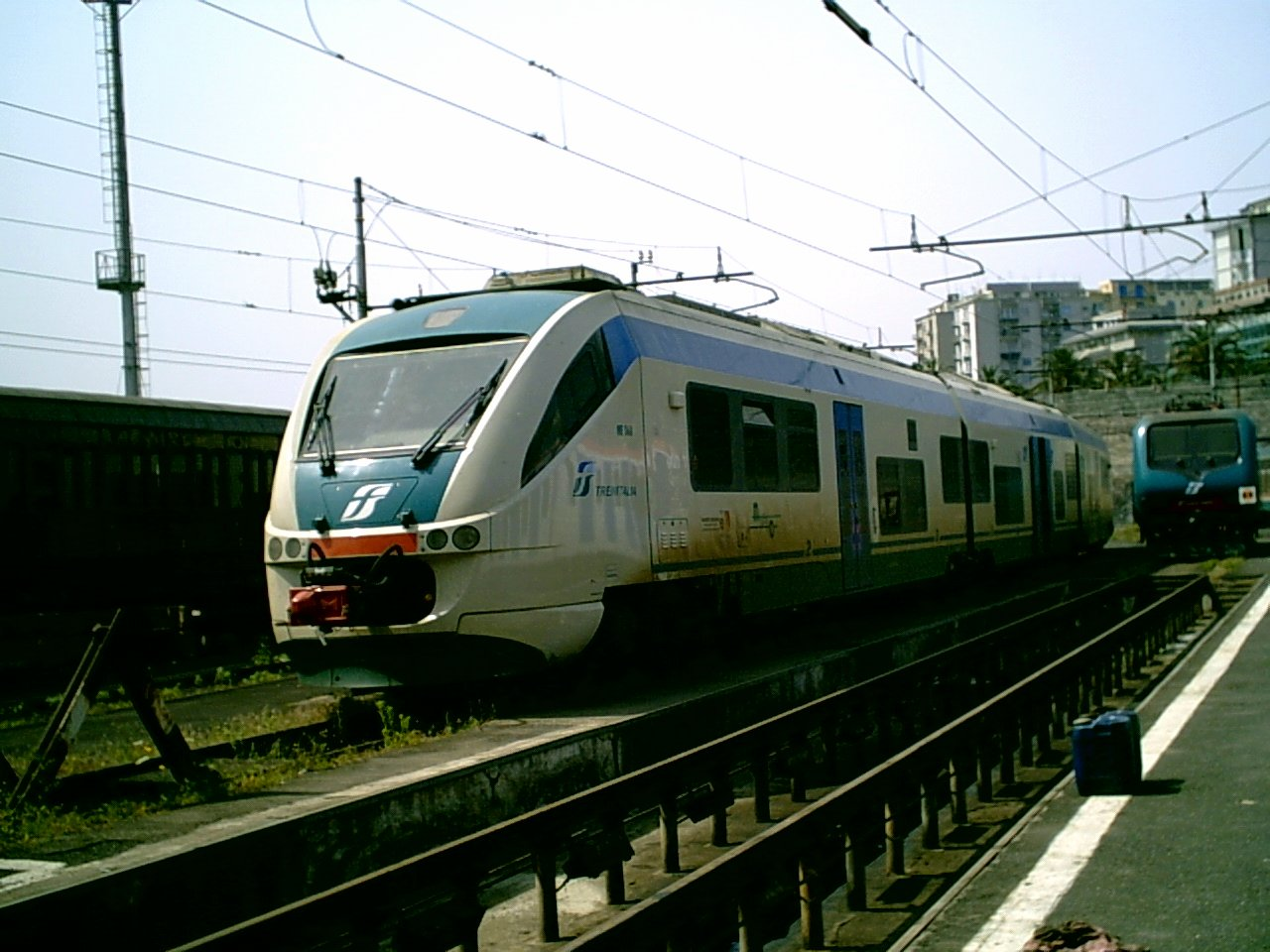
A "Minuetto" train (in service on some Sicilian lines), stopping at the Catania Locomotive Depot.

Sicily's rail network has a predominantly local significance; connections, via the strait, ferrying rolling stock between the stations of Villa San Giovanni and Messina Marittima were greatly reduced during the first decade of the 2000s. Overall long-distance passenger traffic, which had been intense from the 1960s onward, gradually declined to extremely modest levels. Only commuter traffic around larger urban areas has some consistency. The busiest routes are the coastal Tyrrhenian lines, on the sections afferent to Palermo and Messina, and the Ionian lines, on the Messina-Catania line.

The most important rail installations, namely those of Palermo, Messina and Catania have suffered a steady decline in long-distance passenger traffic since the last years of the last century. The gradual corporate disengagement of the FS group, which has consistently decreased the supply of rail services, has also contributed. Rail freight traffic, whose most important terminals are the Bicocca station, in the area of which the Bicocca interport is being built, and the stations, home to freight hubs, of Gela, Termini Imerese, Priolo and Cannizzaro, are also in steep decline.

== Fast lines and ongoing projects ==
There are no high-speed lines in Sicily even though there have been widespread, on several occasions, design assumptions by the FS regarding the construction of a high-speed line in Sicily; almost as a continuation of an equivalent HS/HC Battipaglia-Reggio Calabria line framed within the European program of a Berlin–Palermo railway axis. The work includes significant upgrades along a number of lines in the Sicilian network, including the Palermo-Agrigento railway. The section of the line to Trapani that runs through the city of Palermo has been largely buried, freeing up large areas on the surface, and was reopened to rail traffic in October 2018, after 3 years since its closure, for its renovation and track doubling, with the construction of new underground stops. This enabled the optimization of the metropolitan railway service, which has been in operation since 2001, linking the regional capital and its surrounding municipalities with Punta Raisi Airport. A similar project is being carried out on the section of the Ionian railway that runs through the Etnean capital, where the Catania junction is being upgraded. It also includes the construction of the Catania Aeroporto Fontanarossa station, opening on 14 March 2021 to serve the Catania-Fontanarossa Airport. Other projects include the joining of the island's rail network with the planned Catania Bicocca Interport and, on the Messina-Siracusa, track doubling between Giampilieri and Fiumefreddo and speeding up the route between Catania and Syracuse.

With the doubling of the Palermo-Messina section from Patti to the Peloritan capital completed, construction has begun on the doubling of the section between Fiumetorto and Cefalù Ogliastrillo. The intermediate Patti-Castelbuono section has remained single-track, but there is a feasibility study as well as a preliminary project for doubling between Patti and Capo D'Orlando. Construction sites for the Castelbuono-Fiumetorto section were opened on 15 September 2008; in October 2017, the section from Campofelice to Ogliastrillo was opened.

The Palermo-Catania section of the only planned high-capacity line, whose preliminary design dates back to the early 1990s, at the time of the establishment of the Ente FS in the original plans, would have retained the current route as the basis for the Catania-Catenanuova route, albeit with appropriate adjustments. Instead, an entirely new route would have been built for the Erei-Madonie-Cefalù-Palermo route: the new railway would have involved a long tunnel section to avoid the high gradients and unstable terrain of inland Sicily and speed up the line. This project met with objections from the province of Enna because it did not include its capital. Variants have been proposed over the years that, while crossing the territories of central Sicily, would involve increases in travel time and require less financial resources. The "institutional contract" of 28 February 2013, partly accepted what had previously been proposed, elaborating on the contested aspects regarding the central section of the line, on which a decision will still have to be made in a rather short time frame; regarding this section, the point of detachment from the old route has been modified, taking it from Catenanuova to Raddusa/Agira. The contract seems to have laid the groundwork for a start on the modernization of the important route, so much so that the government the following year earmarked more than 800 million for the Palermo-Messina-Catania rail axis to carry out part of the work.

Other interventions have recently been set on the Canicattì-Siracusa section between Comiso and Canicattì, with a view to strengthening and shortening connections with the new Comiso Airport, with a 35-million investment.

Alongside the projects, however, the shortcomings of the island's rail system also remain evident, which appears, especially in its internal lines, to be obsolete and uncompetitive in its infrastructure, forcing convoys to move very often at average speeds below 100 km/h. Most of the lines are, moreover, single track. This combination of factors makes it unlikely that the gap with "continental" infrastructure can be closed in the medium to short term.

Moreover, the lines cross areas that are geologically unstable, which undermine the delicate rail and road structure of Sicily, further penalizing rail transport, given the long times and high costs required to restore the damaged sections: suffice it to say that to date, the Caltagirone - Gela and Trapani - Palermo via Milo sections, closed since 8 May 2011 and 25 February 2013 respectively, for a total of more than 130 km in total, are unusable due to structural failure or landslides. Added to this is the fact that many areas, especially inland, lack rail links altogether, despite the precarious condition of the road system and the tourism potential they express: reference can usefully be made to the southern coast of Agrigento and the inland areas of the province of Enna, which were traversed by narrow-gauge railways that were closed in the second half of the 20th century.

== Sicilian trains by name ==
As in the rest of the Italian railway network, named trains have been running in Sicily. In the past, the most important passenger trains were identified in this way, but for some time now only some domestic suburban or tourist routes have received a name.

Name	Route	Period	Notes
Akragas Express	Agrigento Centrale - Porto Empedocle	Periodic, since 2010	Touristic
Archimede	Roma Termini - Siracusa; Roma Termini - Palermo Centrale		Intercity
Aurora	Roma Termini - Siracusa	1974	Rapid, later discontinued in Sicilian sec.
Conca d'Oro	Roma Termini - Palermo Centrale	Discontinued in 2007	Intercity-Night; Currently Express "Bellini" and "Gattopardo"
Freccia del Sud	Milano Centrale - Agrigento Centrale; Milano Centrale - Siracusa; Roma Termini - Agrigento Centrale	Discontinued between 2009 and 2010	Express
Freccia della Laguna	Venezia S. Lucia - Siracusa - Palermo Centrale; Venezia S. Lucia - Palermo Centrale - Siracusa	Discontinued in 2011	Express
Peloritano	Roma Termini - Palermo Centrale; Roma Termini - Siracusa		Intercity, then Intercity Plus
Treno del Barocco	Siracusa - Ragusa	Periodic since 2005	Touristic (summer only)
Treno dei Mille	Calatafimi/Segesta - Marsala	Since 2009	Touristic (May 11)
Treno dell'Etna	Torino Porta Nuova - Siracusa - Palermo Centrale	Discontinued since 2007	Express
Treno del Sole	Torino Porta Nuova - Palermo Centrale - Siracusa	Discontinued since 2011	Express with beds and couchettes
Trinacria	Milano Centrale – Palermo Centrale - Siracusa		Express, currently Intercity-Night with beds and couchettes
Trinacria Express	Palermo Centrale – Punta Raisi	Since 2001	Regional

== Suburban and metropolitan rail transport ==
In Sicily there is only one metro, the Catania metro.

In Palermo, the State Railways operate a metropolitan railway service, sometimes improperly referred to as a "metro."

A suburban rail service (the so-called "metroferrovia") has also been activated in Messina by adapting part of the route of the railway line to Catania, which connects the suburbs of the city's territory to the Messina Centrale station as far as Giampilieri, south of the city.

=== Palermo ===
Map of Palermo metropolitan railway service

Palermo's first metropolitan railway service activated in 1990 on the occasion of the 1990 FIFA World Cup was less extensive than the current one and consisted of only the section from Palermo Centrale to Giachery. It has become important in the Sicilian transportation network both in terms of extension and passenger traffic. It is operated by Trenitalia and consists of 2 lines, connecting Palermo Centrale to Punta Raisi and Palermo Notarbartolo to Giachery.

=== Palermo Centrale-Punta Raisi line ===
From Palermo Centrale to Palazzo Reale Orleans it is above ground and single track, before going underground as far as Francia station and then re-emerging outside the city. From here on, it passes through the main centers of the western district, Capaci and Carini, and from the latter to Punta Raisi Airport, it is a double-track section, with considerable commuter and tourist traffic between the air terminal and the Sicilian capital. The line operates from 4:45 a.m. to 10 p.m. in the direction of the Airport and from 5:30 a.m. to 11 p.m. in the direction of the Central Station every day of the week, with reduced number of runs on holidays. The frequency is one run every 30 minutes in the urban area from Central Station to Tommaso Natale and every 60 minutes for the Trinacria Express service to the airport. These stations are:

- Centrale
- Guadagna
- Vespri
- Palazzo Reale-Orleans
- Lolli
- Notarbartolo
- Francia
- San Lorenzo Colli
- La Malfa
- Cardillo-Zen
- Tommaso Natale
- Sferracavallo
- Isola delle Femmine
- Capaci
- Carini Torre Ciachea
- Carini
- Piraineto
- Punta Raisi (airport).

=== Palermo Notarbartolo-Giachery line ===
The short route consists of a single underground track from Notarbartolo to Federico; the rest is in trenches. The line operates from 6:40 a.m. to 8:40 p.m., weekdays only. The frequency of service is one run every 30 minutes in the urban area.

The line has 4 stations:

- Notarbartolo
- Federico
- Fiera
- Giachery

=== Planned expansions ===
- Rail link: the construction site was opened on 22 February 2008 with the intention of doubling the track, burying part of the line and creating 9 new stops: Roccella, Brancaccio residential, Guadagna, Palazzo di Giustizia, Lolli, Lazio-Restivo, Belgio, La Malfa, Sferracavallo the completion of the work was expected by 2012.[1]
- Railway ring: works include the construction of 4 new stops (Porto, Politeama, Malaspina-Catania, Lazio-Libertà) and the extension of the line.
- Light rail: an automatic light rail line has been planned since 2006: when fully operational, the project envisages that the line will connect the southern area of the Oreto-Guadagna UPL with Mondello, passing through the historic center, (Central station, ex-Borsa, Politeama Theater), Notarbartolo station and the northern suburbs of San Lorenzo, the ZEN and Partanna, for a total of 20.77 km and 23 stations. In the first five years of the 2010s the project seemed to fade away, however in 2017 a resolution of the city council announced the conclusion of the preliminary design process approved by MIT. In May 2019, the municipality announces its participation in the ministry's notice on "Submission of applications for access to resources earmarked for Mass Rapid Transit with Fixed Installations," with a deadline of 31 December 2019, in order to obtain at least funding for the first functional Oreto-Notarbartolo lot, about 6 kilometers long with 8 stations, whose costs are around 850 million euros. On 6 August 2020 it was announced that the City of Palermo had submitted the funding application for the design adjustment of the work, with a total amount of €300000.

=== Catania ===
Subway map of Catania

The first section of the Catania metro was inaugurated on 27 June 1999, and went into service on 11 July that year. Initially planned as a landfill of the urban-crossing line of the Circumetnea Railway during the planning process, it was redesigned as a full-fledged metro managed by the FCE itself. Its construction, albeit with some phases of work slowdown, has continued by progressively activating other sections of the urban service but with the aim of extending the connection to the Piedmontese Etna centers of Paternò, Piano Tavola and Misterbianco and to reach Librino and Fontanarossa airport.

Since 2017, the Nesima-Stesicoro section has been in operation; the Galatea-Porto single-track overground branch line is temporarily closed for maintenance. The network has 11 stations, 10 of which are underground. The above-ground track runs along the coastal area flanked by FS tracks at Catania Centrale station, single-track for 1815 m (between Galatea and Porto). The metro is served by "M.88" and "CT0" series electric trains, built by Firema.

The Catania rail link is being built, of which the urban section between Cannizzaro, Ognina and Catania Centrale is already active, while the one between Catania and Bicocca (whose station will be underground) is still in the executive design phase, as is the entire RFI track of the affected section of the Messina-Catania with the creation of 4 additional stops. The construction of a "Fontanarossa" stop near the Fontanarossa airport began in February 2019.

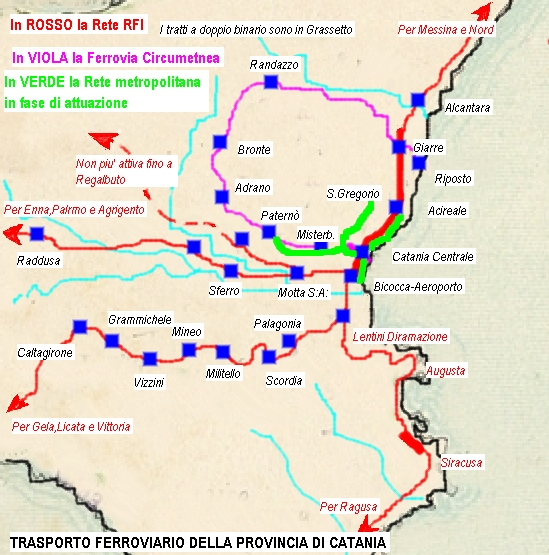
The future layout of metropolitan and suburban transport in Catania

Other metro "sections" are under construction: Nesima-Misterbianco and Stesicoro-Palestro, and an extension to the airport is at an advanced planning stage. The Misterbianco-Paternò suburban extension, 11.5 km long and with 7 stations to be built, is still to be financed.

=== Messina ===
In Messina, the so-called Metroferrovia came into operation on 15 June 2009, to connect the city center to the southern suburbs with a dedicated train service, making use of the double-track route of the Messina-Catania railway, for a total of 16 km in the urban section of Messina; 11 stops were established. The service is operated by RFI through a service contract and uses a Minuetto electric train shuttling round trips daily. The service was suspended from 1 October 2009 due to the 2009 Messina floods and restored from 27 September 2010. However, the service is not regular and is hardly used.

== Tramways ==
Between the late nineteenth and early twentieth centuries, a number of extra-urban tramway lines were also built in Sicily to connect the larger cities and the surrounding area; they lost their viability as a result of the development of road transport from the 1930s onward.

These included the Catania-Acireale tramway, which connected the Etna capital with Acireale following a 14.3-km route through Aci Castello and Aci Trezza; opened in 1915, it was closed in 1934.

Another extra-urban line was the tramway, of electric funicular type, which ran up the hill of Monreale at about 300 m above sea level. It had a strong tourist value because of the panoramic views on the way.

Extensive extra-urban tramway lines were built in Messina with a total length of 74 km: the Messina-Granatari-Barcellona Pozzo di Gotto tramway, which ran northward from the Peloritan capital and was inaugurated in 1890, and the Messina-Giampilieri tramway heading south, both promoted by a Belgian-owned company.

Other tramway lines were built for mining transport in central and southwestern Sicily. In the Sicilian hinterland, the Raddusa-Miniera di Sant'Agostino was created, attested at the Raddusa-Agira station of the Catania-Palermo railway intended to serve the numerous sulfur mines in the Ennese area and the Porto Empedocle-Lucia for those in the Agrigento area.

Beginning in the late 1930s and after World War II, the Sicilian tramway lines were discontinued one after another and replaced by trolleybus or bus lines.

=== Palermo tram network ===
Map of the 4 lines of the Palermo tramway network

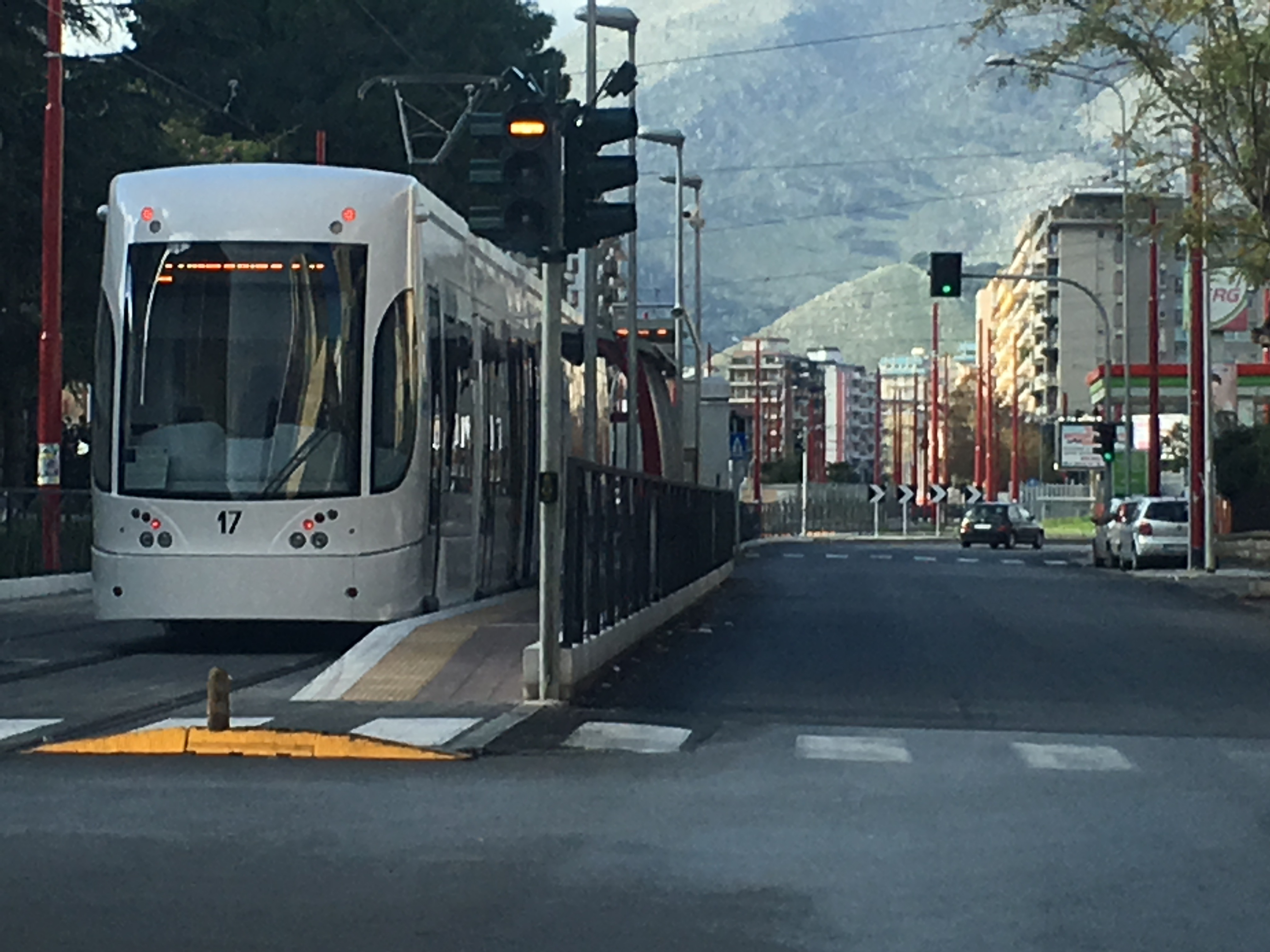
Bombardier Flexity Outlook, used for the tram network in Palermo, via Leonardo da Vinci

At the end of the 20th century, a project, called "P. & C.M. Service, for the design and construction of 3 tramway lines in Palermo," was studied to meet the mobility needs of the city of Palermo; commissioned by Italconsult S.p.A. and Groupe Scetauroute, it underwent a revision in 1998. Responsible for the revision and executive design was engineer Vinicio Brandani. The system included three lines: one from the Roccella industrial area to the Central Station, one from the Borgo Nuovo district to the Notarbartolo railway station, and one from the San Giovanni Apostolo district (former Cep) to the Notarbartolo station, passing through Sicilian Region Avenue to the Corso Calatafimi interchange. The project included numerous ancillary works such as three pedestrian overpasses along the Sicilian Region avenue between Einstein Square and Corso Calatafimi; roadway improvements; two rolling stock depots with adjoining workshops, in the Roccella industrial area and on Via Castellana; and the routes on protected lanes entirely separate from the roadways. The planned in-service trains: 17 bi-directional 250-seat trainsets (of which 62 seated), with 6 accesses on each side and equipped with information systems with screens and internal audio. Commercial speed was expected to be about 20 km/h. The overall development of the system of just over 15 km, with 40 stops (almost every 400 meters) had a total cost of about 192 million euros. It was planned to be completed within 5 years from the start of construction (October 2006) with the three lines completed approximately 44, 48, and 52 months from the start date. On 30 December 2005 the contract was awarded to a temporary association of companies consisting of the Turin-based "Sis" consortium, the Rome-based firms "Bombardier Transportation Italy" and "Mosco & Associati," Messina-based "Edil Scavi," Milan-based "Amec Spie Rail," and the Berlin-based, "Seib Ingenieur-Consult," Ingenieurbüro Wosnitza e Knappe" and "ETC Transport Consultants." The construction sites opened in October 2006 and began work in June 2007.

Palermo's tramway network, consisting of four urban tramway lines was inaugurated on December 30, 2015 with the following lines:

- Roccella - Stazione Centrale
- Borgo Nuovo - Stazione Notarbartolo
- CEP - Stazione Notarbartolo
- Corso Calatafimi - Stazione Notarbartolo

=== Tramway of Messina ===
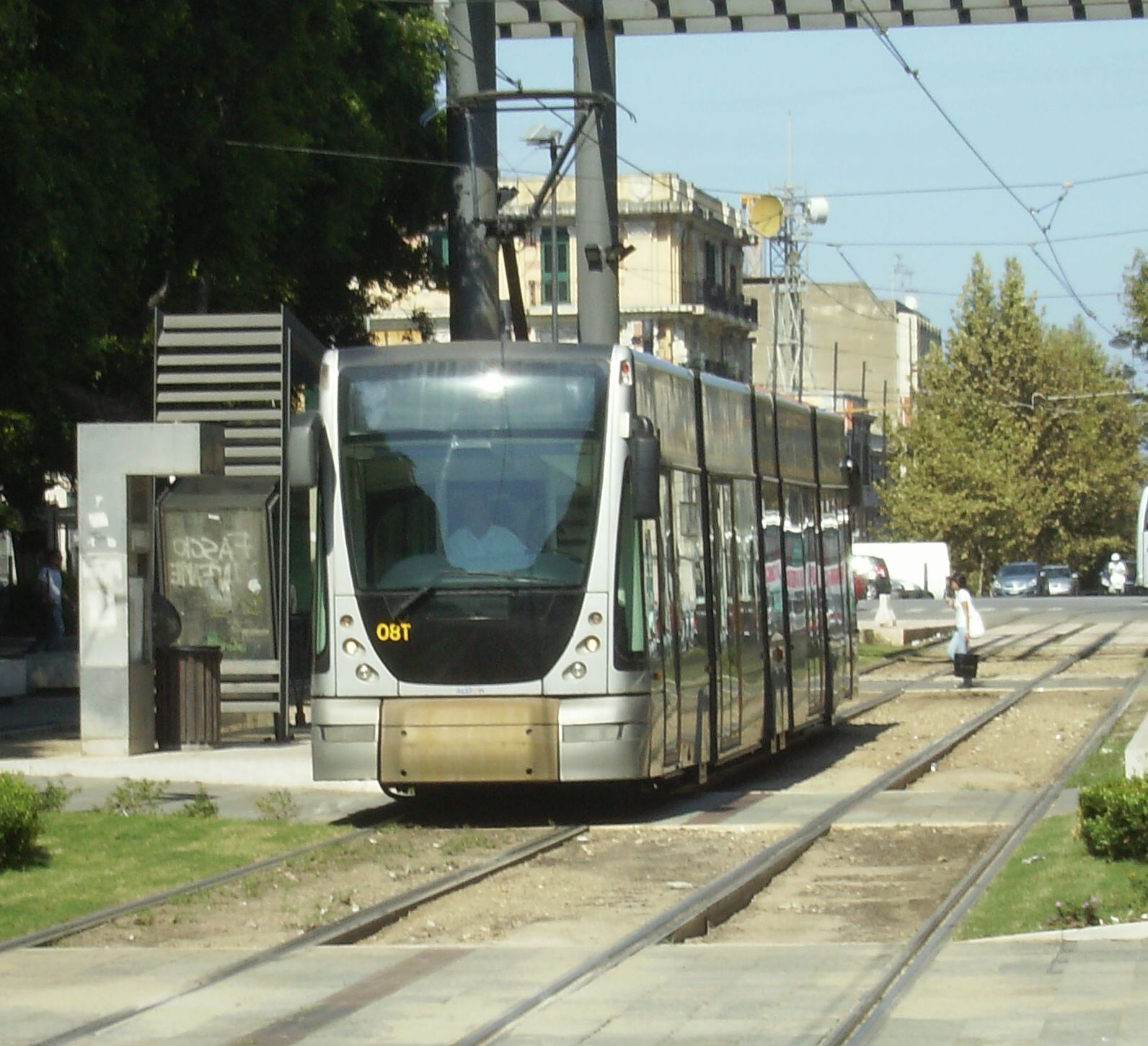
A tramway of the Messina tramway

The 7.7-kilometer-long Messina tramway came into operation in Messina on 3 April 2003 after a long gestation and construction period and more than half a century after the decommissioning of the previous urban network whose last line had been discontinued in 1951; 15 Alstom's Cityway model 5-element articulated streetcars were put into operation to carry out the service.

The streetcars make 18 stops and make it possible to reach the Polyclinic, the southern bus terminus (at the Gazzi end of the line), and the cemetery; they run through the city center along San Martino Avenue and Cairoli Square.

== See also ==
- Ferrovia Circumetnea
- History of rail transport in Italy
- Ferrovie dello Stato Italiane

== Bibliography ==
- Abate, Ogliari (2008). Le linee delle FS a scartamento ridotto a cremagliera in Scilia in Si viaggia anche in dentiera. Milan: Arcipelago edizioni.
- Barni, Enrico (1990). "Profili di storia ferroviaria italiana". Amm. Ferroviaria.
- Barone, Giuseppe (2002). Le vie del Mezzogiorno. Rome: Donzelli Editore. ISBN 88-7989-684-9.
- Caliri, Ettore (1994). Gela 15 anni dopo, in Itreni-150. Salò: Edizioni ETR.
- Cirillo, Mario (1969). "Vicende ed evoluzione delle ferrovie italiane". La tecnica professionale. Rome: CIFI.
- Coletti, Giovanni (1972). "Il passaggio delle ferrovie dall'amministrazione privata all'amministrazione pubblica nel 1905". La Tecnica Professionale. Rome: CIFI.
- Crisafulli, Alessandro (2000). "Il sistema ferroviario siciliano e l'inchiesta Borsani-Bonfadini". Ingegneria Ferroviaria. 55 (7): 461–472.
- Cruciani, Marcello; Zanotti, Roberto (2002). "Pubblico e privato nella storia delle ferrovie". I Treni (223 ed.). Edizioni Etr.
- D'Addio, Michele; Casucci, Aristide (1970). "Il potenziamento e il nuovo sistema della linea Lentini d.ne-Gela". La Tecnica Professionale. Rome: CIFI.
- Ettore Caliri, Salvatore Amoroso (1986). La linea di Vallelunga. La tormentata genesi del collegamento ferroviario fra Palermo e Catania. Palermo: Aracne.
- Federici, Antonio (1999). Tuttotreno Tema 14, Lo scartamento ridotto in Italia. Albignasego: Duegi Editrice.
- Formigari, Vittorio; Romano, Giulio (2001). 123 anni di tram a Messina. Cortona: Calosci. ISBN 88-7785-175-9.
- Giarrizzo, Giuseppe (1986). Catania. Bari: Laterza editore. ISBN 88-420-2786-3.
- Giuffrida, Romualdo (1967). Lo Stato e le ferrovie in Sicilia (1860-1895). Caltanissetta: Sciascia Editore.
- Giuliani, Paolo; Sirolli, Raffaele (2004). "L'impegno di RFI nel Mezzogiorno" (PDF). RFI Argomenti. 2 (4): 6–101. Archived from the original (PDF) on March 4, 2016.
- Inzerilli, Massimo (2013). Ferrovie siciliane in abbandono, in iTreni, n. 356, febbraio 2013, pp. 20-26. Salò: ETR.
- Ippolito, Felice (1988). Amici e Maestri: lo Stato e le ferrovie. Bari: edizioni Dedalo. ISBN 978-88-220-6076-1.
- Kalla-Bishop, Peter Michael (1970). Mediterranean island railways. Newton Abbott, David & Charles. ISBN 0-7153-4761-6.
- Maggiore Perni, Francesco (1861). Delle strade ferrate in Sicilia. Palermo: Tipografia Michele Amenta.
- Marini, Renzo (1969). "La nuova ferrovia Caltagirone-Gela". Ingegneria Ferroviaria (11). Rome: CIFI.
- Molino, Nico; Pautasso, Sergio (1983). Le automotrici della prima generazione. Turin: ElleDi. ISBN 88-7649-016-7.
- Molino, Nico (1985). La rete FS a scartamento ridotto della Sicilia. Turin: Edizioni Elledi. ISBN 88-7649-037-X.
- Molino, Nico; Sinchetto, Beppe (1985). Linee ferroviarie. La Paola-Cosenza. Torino: Elledi. ISBN 88-7649-032-9.
- Muscolino, Piero (2006). Le ferrovie della Sicilia sud-orientale. Ragusa: EdiARGO.
- Ogliari, Francesco (1977). "Dilettoso viaggio". Storia dei Trasporti Italiani. 31–33. Milan: Cavallotti.
- Sergi, Giuseppe (1980). "Nuova ferrovia Caltagirone-Gela". ITreni (1). Desenzano: ETR.
- Sergio Cannarozzo, Salvatore Amoroso (1979). Le ferrovie in Sicilia. Palermo: Università degli Studi di Palermo. Facoltà di Ingegneria. Istituto di trasporti.
- Sergio Cannarozzo, Salvatore Amoroso (1984). Le ferrovie in Sicilia. Analisi economica del traffico viaggiatori e merci. Palermo: Università degli Studi di Palermo. Facoltà di Ingegneria. Istituto di trasporti.
- Squarzina, Federico (1963). Produzione e commercio dello zolfo in Sicilia nel secolo XIX. ILTE.
- Tesoriere, Giuseppe (1994). Viabilità antica in Sicilia. Dalla colonizzazione greca all'unificazione (1860). Palermo: Zedi Italia.
- Tiberi, Gianfranco (1989). "Gli investimenti ferroviari:150 anni di altalena". La Tecnica Professionale. Rome: CIFI.
