= List of railway stations in Sicily =

This is the list of the railway stations in Sicily owned by:

- Rete Ferroviaria Italiana (RFI), a branch of the Italian state company Ferrovie dello Stato;
- Ferrovia Circumetnea (FCE).

== RFI stations ==
| Station | Locality | Province | Category |
|---|---|---|---|
| Acate | Acate | Ragusa | Bronze |
| Acireale | Acireale | Catania | Silver |
| Acquaviva-Casteltermini | Acquaviva Platani | Agrigento | Bronze |
| Acquedolci-San Fratello | Acquedolci | Messina | Bronze |
| Agrigento Bassa | Agrigento | Agrigento | Silver |
| Agrigento Centrale | Agrigento | Agrigento | Silver |
| Alcamo Diramazione | Alcamo | Trapani | Silver |
| Alcantara | Taormina | Messina | Bronze |
| Alì Terme | Alì Terme | Messina | Silver |
| Altavilla Milicia | Altavilla Milicia | Palermo | Bronze |
| Aragona-Caldare | Aragona | Agrigento | Silver |
| Augusta | Augusta | Syracuse (Siracusa) | Bronze |
| Avola | Avola | Syracuse (Siracusa) | Bronze |
| Bagheria | Bagheria | Palermo | Silver |
| Balestrate | Balestrate | Palermo | Bronze |
| Barcellona-Castroreale | Barcellona Pozzo di Gotto | Messina | Bronze |
| Brolo-Ficarra | Brolo | Messina | Silver |
| Calatabiano | Calatabiano | Catania | Bronze |
| Calatafimi | Calatafimi | Trapani | Bronze |
| Caltagirone | Caltagirone | Catania | Silver |
| Caltanissetta Centrale | Caltanissetta | Caltanissetta | Silver |
| Caltanissetta Xirbi | Caltanissetta | Caltanissetta | Silver |
| Cammarata-San Giovanni Gemini | Cammarata | Agrigento | Bronze |
| Campobello di Mazara | Campobello di Mazara | Trapani | Silver |
| Campobello-Ravanusa | Campobello di Licata | Agrigento | Bronze |
| Campofelice | Campofelice | Palermo | Bronze |
| Campofranco | Campofranco | Caltanissetta | Bronze |
| Canicattì | Canicattì | Agrigento | Bronze |
| Cannizzaro | Cannizzaro | Catania | Bronze |
| Capaci | Capaci | Palermo | Bronze |
| Capo d'Orlando-Naso | Capo d'Orlando | Messina | Silver |
| Carini | Carini | Palermo | Silver |
| Carini Torre Ciachea | Carini | Palermo | Bronze |
| Caronia | Caronia | Messina | Bronze |
| Carruba | Carruba | Catania | Bronze |
| Castelbuono | Castelbuono | Palermo | Bronze |
| Casteldaccia | Casteldaccia | Palermo | Bronze |
| Castellammare del Golfo | Castellammare del Golfo | Trapani | Silver |
| Castelvetrano | Castelvetrano | Trapani | Silver |
| Catania Acquicella | Catania | Catania | Silver |
| Catania Bicocca | Catania | Catania | Silver |
| Catania Centrale | Catania | Catania | Gold |
| Catania Ognina | Catania | Catania | Bronze |
| Catenanuova-Centuripe | Catenanuova | Enna | Bronze |
| Cefalù | Cefalù | Palermo | Silver |
| Cerda | Cerda | Palermo | Bronze |
| Cinisi-Terrasini | Cinisi | Palermo | Silver |
| Comiso | Comiso | Ragusa | Bronze |
| Dittaino | Assoro | Enna | Bronze |
| Donnafugata | Donnafugata | Ragusa | Bronze |
| Enna | Enna | Enna | Silver |
| Falconara | Butera | Caltanissetta | Bronze |
| Falcone | Falcone | Messina | Bronze |
| Ficarazzi | Ficarazzi | Palermo | Bronze |
| Fiumefreddo di Sicilia | Fiumefreddo di Sicilia | Catania | Bronze |
| Furci | Furci Siculo | Messina | Bronze |
| Galati railway station | Messina | Messina | Bronze |
| Gela | Gela | Caltanissetta | Silver |
| Gela Anic | Gela | Caltanissetta | Bronze |
| Giampilieri | Giampilieri | Messina | Bronze |
| Giarre-Riposto | Giarre | Catania | Silver |
| Gioiosa Marea | Gioiosa Marea | Messina | Bronze |
| Grammichele | Grammichele | Catania | Bronze |
| Grotte | Grotte | Agrigento | Bronze |
| Guardia-Mangano-Santa Venerina | Guardia | Catania | Bronze |
| Isola delle Femmine | Isola delle Femmine | Palermo | Silver |
| Ispica | Ispica | Ragusa | Bronze |
| Lascari-Gratteri | Lascari | Palermo | Bronze |
| Lentini | Lentini | Syracuse (Siracusa) | Bronze |
| Lentini Diramazione | Lentini | Syracuse (Siracusa) | Bronze |
| Leonforte-Pirato | Leonforte | Enna | Bronze |
| Letojanni | Letojanni | Messina | Silver |
| Licata | Licata | Agrigento | Bronze |
| Marausa | Marausa | Trapani | Bronze |
| Marsala | Marsala | Trapani | Silver |
| Mascali | Mascali | Catania | Bronze |
| Mazara del Vallo | Mazara del Vallo | Trapani | Silver |
| Messina Centrale and Messina Marittima | Messina | Messina | Gold |
| Messina Contesse | Messina | Messina | Bronze |
| Messina Fiumara Gazzi | Messina | Messina | Bronze |
| Milazzo | Milazzo | Messina | Silver |
| Mili Marina | Messina | Messina | Bronze |
| Militello | Militello in Val di Catania | Catania | Bronze |
| Modica | Modica | Ragusa | Silver |
| Montemaggiore Belsito | Montemaggiore Belsito | Palermo | Bronze |
| Mozia-Birgi | Mozia | Trapani | Bronze |
| Niscemi | Niscemi | Caltanissetta | Bronze |
| Nizza di Sicilia | Nizza di Sicilia | Messina | Bronze |
| Noto | Noto | Syracuse (Siracusa) | Silver |
| Novara-Montalbano-Furnari | Novara di Sicilia | Messina | Bronze |
| Oliveri-Tindari | Oliveri | Messina | Silver |
| Pace del Mela | Pace del Mela | Messina | Silver |
| Paceco | Paceco | Trapani | Bronze |
| Palermo Brancaccio | Palermo | Palermo | Silver |
| Palermo Cardillo-Zen | Palermo | Palermo | Bronze |
| Palermo Centrale | Palermo | Palermo | Platinum |
| Palermo Notarbartolo | Palermo | Palermo | Gold |
| Palermo Federico | Palermo | Palermo | Silver |
| Palermo Fiera | Palermo | Palermo | Silver |
| Palermo Francia | Palermo | Palermo | Silver |
| Palermo Giachery | Palermo | Palermo | Silver |
| Palermo Palazzo Reale-Orleans | Palermo | Palermo | Silver |
| Palermo San Lorenzo Colli | Palermo | Palermo | Silver |
| Palermo Tommaso Natale | Palermo | Palermo | Bronze |
| Palermo Vespri | Palermo | Palermo | Silver |
| Partinico | Partinico | Palermo | Bronze |
| Patti-San Piero Patti | Patti | Messina | Silver |
| Petrosino-Strasatti | Petrosino | Trapani | Bronze |
| Piraineto | Carini | Palermo | Silver |
| Pollina-San Mauro Castelverde | Pollina | Palermo | Bronze |
| Ponte Santo Stefano | Messina | Messina | Bronze |
| Porto Empedocle | Porto Empedocle | Agrigento | Bronze |
| Pozzallo | Pozzallo | Ragusa | Bronze |
| Priolo-Melilli | Priolo Gargallo | Syracuse (Siracusa) | Bronze |
| Punta Raisi | Punta Raisi | Palermo | Silver |
| Racalmuto | Racalmuto | Agrigento | Bronze |
| Ragusa | Ragusa | Ragusa | Silver |
| Roccalumera-Mandanici | Roccalumera | Messina | Silver |
| Roccapalumba-Alia | Roccapalumba | Palermo | Silver |
| Rometta Messinese | Rometta | Messina | Bronze |
| Rosolini | Rosolini | Syracuse (Siracusa) | Bronze |
| Sant'Agata di Militello | Sant'Agata di Militello | Messina | Silver |
| Sant'Alessio Siculo-Forza d'Agrò | Sant'Alessio Siculo | Messina | Bronze |
| San Cataldo | San Cataldo | Caltanissetta | Bronze |
| Santa Flavia-Solunto-Porticello | Santa Flavia | Palermo | Silver |
| San Giorgio | San Giorgio | Messina | Bronze |
| San Marco d'Alunzio-Torrenova | San Marco d'Alunzio | Messina | Bronze |
| San Nicola Tonnara | San Nicola l'Arena | Palermo | Bronze |
| Santo Stefano di Camastra-Mistretta | Santo Stefano di Camastra | Messina | Silver |
| Santa Teresa di Riva | Santa Teresa di Riva | Messina | Silver |
| Salemi-Gibellina | Gibellina and Salemi | Trapani | Bronze |
| Sampieri | Sampieri | Ragusa | Bronze |
| Scaletta Zanclea | Scaletta Zanclea | Messina | Bronze |
| Scicli | Scicli | Ragusa | Bronze |
| Scordia | Scordia | Catania | Bronze |
| Segesta Tempio | Segesta | Trapani | Silver |
| Serradifalco | Serradifalco | Caltanissetta | Bronze |
| Siracusa | Siracusa | Syracuse (Siracusa) | Silver |
| Spadafora | Spadafora | Messina | Bronze |
| Spagnuola | Spagnuola | Trapani | Bronze |
| Taormina-Giardini | Taormina | Messina | Silver |
| Targia | Siracusa | Syracuse (Siracusa) | Bronze |
| Tempio di Vulcano | Agrigento | Agrigento | Bronze |
| Termini Imerese | Termini Imerese | Palermo | Silver |
| Terrenove | Terrenove | Trapani | Bronze |
| Torregrotta | Torregrotta | Messina | Bronze |
| Trabia | Trabia | Palermo | Silver |
| Trapani | Trapani | Trapani | Silver |
| Trappeto | Trappeto | Palermo | Silver |
| Tremestieri | Tremestieri | Messina | Bronze |
| Tusa | Tusa | Messina | Silver |
| Valledolmo | Valledolmo | Palermo | Bronze |
| Vallelunga | Vallelunga Pratameno | Palermo | Bronze |
| Villafranca-Saponara | Villafranca Tirrena | Messina | Bronze |
| Villalba | Villalba | Caltanissetta | Bronze |
| Villarosa | Villarosa | Enna | Bronze |
| Vittoria | Vittoria | Ragusa | Silver |
| Vizzini-Licodia | Vizzini | Catania | Bronze |
| Zappulla | Zappulla | Messina | Bronze |

== FCE stations ==
| Station | Locality | Province |
|---|---|---|
| Adrano Cappellone | Adrano | Catania |
| Adrano Centro | Adrano | Catania |
| Adrano Naviccia | Adrano | Catania |
| Adrano Nord | Adrano | Catania |
| Belpasso-Camporotondo | Belpasso | Catania |
| Biancavilla Centro | Biancavilla | Catania |
| Biancavilla Colombo | Biancavilla | Catania |
| Biancavilla Poggio Rosso | Biancavilla | Catania |
| Biancavilla Pozzillo | Biancavilla | Catania |
| Bronte | Bronte | Catania |
| Bronte Casello 54 | Bronte | Catania |
| Calderara | Randazzo | Catania |
| Catania Borgo | Catania | Catania |
| Cerro | Castiglione di Sicilia | Catania |
| Cibali | Catania | Catania |
| Cutula | Giarre | Catania |
| Giaconia | Belpasso | Catania |
| Giarre | Giarre | Catania |
| Gurrida | Randazzo | Catania |
| Lineri | Misterbianco | Catania |
| Linguaglossa | Linguaglossa | Catania |
| Maletto | Maletto | Catania |
| Misterbianco | Misterbianco | Catania |
| Nesima | Catania | Catania |
| Nunziata | Mascali | Catania |
| Passo Pisciaro | Castiglione di Sicilia | Catania |
| Passo Zingaro | Adrano | Catania |
| Paternò | Paternò | Catania |
| Piedimonte Etneo | Piedimonte Etneo | Catania |
| Randazzo | Randazzo | Catania |
| Riposto | Riposto | Catania |
| Ruvolazzo | Bronte | Catania |
| Santa Maria di Licodia Centro | Santa Maria di Licodia | Catania |
| Santa Maria di Licodia Sud | Santa Maria di Licodia | Catania |
| Santa Venera | Mascali | Catania |
| Solicchiata | Castiglione di Sicilia | Catania |
| Terremorte | Piedimonte Etneo | Catania |
| Valcorrente | Belpasso | Catania |
| Villa di Giarre | Giarre | Catania |

== See also ==
- Railway stations in Italy
- Ferrovie dello Stato
- Rail transport in Italy
- High-speed rail in Italy
- Transport in Italy
