= Messina Marittima railway station =

Railway station in Messina, Italy

Messina Marittima
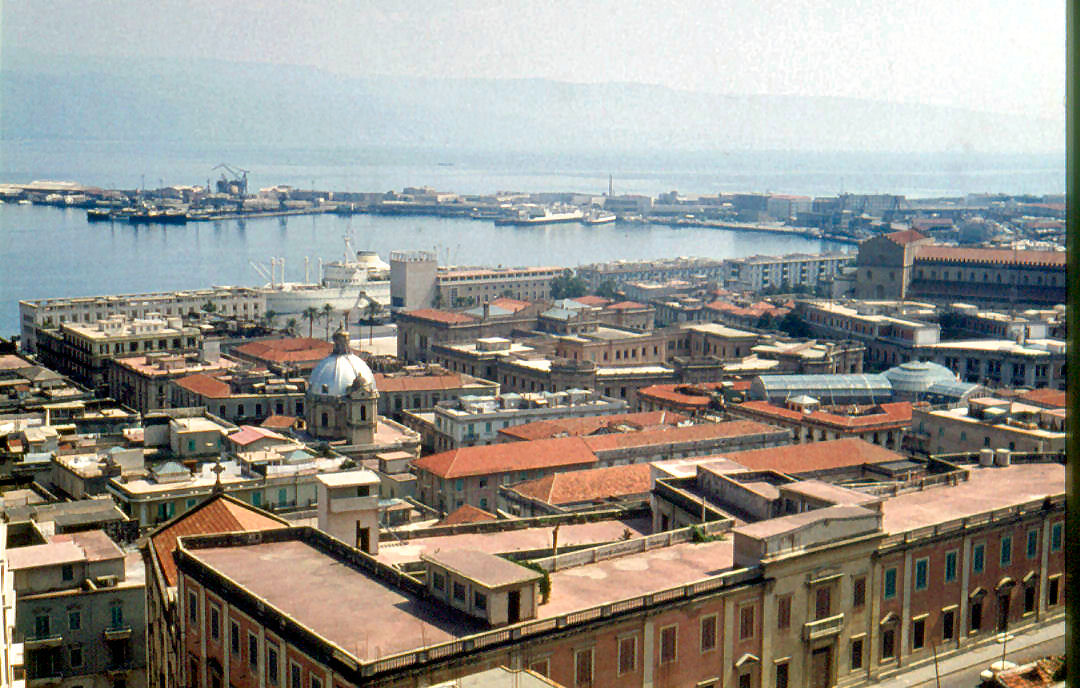
- View of Messina Harbour looking towards the station.

General information
- Location: Piazza della Repubblica; 98100 Messina; Messina, Messina, Sicily; Italy
- Coordinates: 38°11′16″N 15°33′49″E
- Elevation: 6 m (20 ft)
- Operator: Rete Ferroviaria Italiana; Centostazioni
- Lines: Palermo–Messina; Messina–Syracuse
- Distance: 223.764 km (139.041 mi) from Palermo Centrale
- Train operators: Trenitalia
- Connections: Messina trams; Urban buses; Bluvia ferries

Construction
- Architect: Angiolo Mazzoni

Other information
- Classification: Gold

History
- Opened: 20 June 1889; 137 years ago
- Rebuilt: 1937–1939
Location
- Location within Sicily Location within Italy

Messina Marittima railway station (Italian: Stazione di Messina Marittima) is an interchange station for train and ferry services into and out of the city and comune of Messina, on the island of Sicily, Italy. Opened in 1889 and was rebuilt between 1937 and 1939. It forms part of the Palermo–Messina and Messina–Syracuse railways.

The station is currently managed by Rete Ferroviaria Italiana (RFI). However, the commercial area of the passenger building is managed by Centostazioni. Train services to and from the station are operated by Trenitalia, and the connecting ferry services are operated by Bluferries. Each of these companies is a subsidiary of Ferrovie dello Stato (FS), Italy's state-owned rail company.

== Location ==
Messina Marittima railway station is adjacent to Messina Centrale railway station, which is in Piazza della Repubblica, southeast of the city centre.

== History ==
Although Messina Centrale was inaugurated on 12 December 1866, it was not connected with the Port of Messina until 20 June 1889, when a 574 m (1,883 ft) long extension of the line from Palermo Centrale was opened to a new station, which was named Messina Marittima.

The delay in making this connection was due to financial difficulties affecting the Società Vittorio Emanuele, which was taken over by the Società per le strade ferrate della Sicilia (better known as la Sicula) in 1885.

Both stations were severely damaged in the Messina earthquake of 1908 and later reconstructed.

A new station, incorporating both Messina Centrale and Messina Marittima, was built between 1937 and 1939 to replace the two old stations. Designed by the architect Angiolo Mazzoni, the two part passenger building is an example of rationalist architecture, with large spaces and imposing linear elements.

== Features ==
=== Passenger building ===
==== Overview ====
The passenger building is shaped like an arch lying on its side. The western end faces the road and the west pier of the port; the building then extends as a curved structure over the station yard above the platforms.

The south side of the building is attached and merged with Messina Centrale's passenger building.

The building's two levels are connected by escalators and pedestrian stairways; on the ground floor, there are a ticket office, bars, newsagents and services.

==== Architecture ====
The passenger building is a typically impressive fascist design, not lacking in pomposity. Conceived by Mazzoni, its style, incorporating large spaces in a straightforward structure that emphasises the vertical, became the norm for public buildings of the era. Its design makes extensive use of travertine tiling and floor-to-ceiling windows.

==== Salon of Mosaics ====
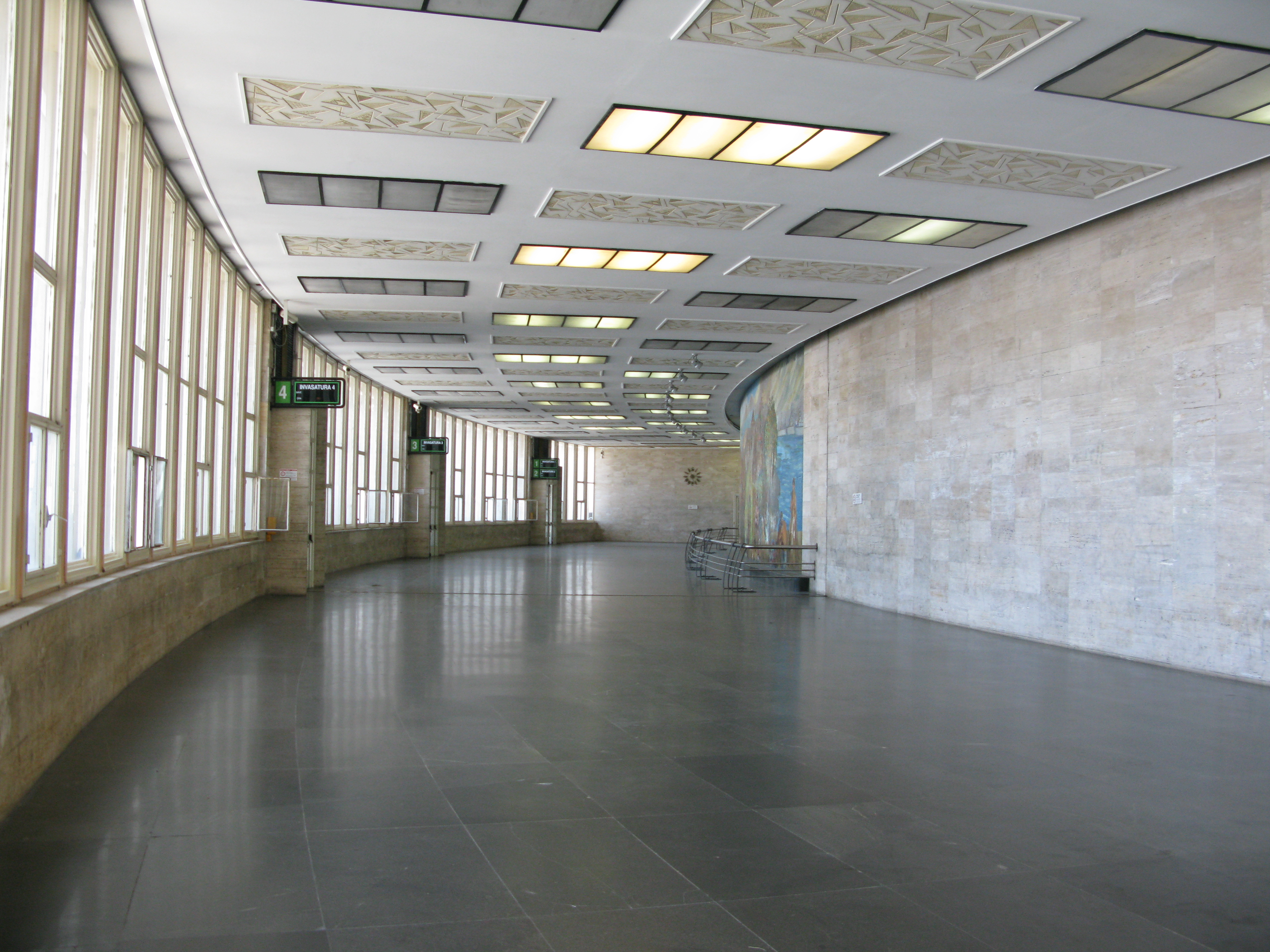
The Salon of Mosaics.

The north side of the passenger building extends parallel to the waterfront, as a long panoramic enclosed bridge crossing the group of tracks leading to the ferry berths.

The hall, or salon, from which the ferries' docking and boarding operations can be seen, is decorated with a mosaic in vitrified tiles depicting historical, social and environmental themes borrowed from the Sicilian tradition.

From openings in the salon at intervals corresponding to the individual berths, long covered gangways extend downwards to give access to passenger ferries.

The final design of the great mosaic was the work of notable Italian artist Michele Cascella. Its subject was inspired by a Mussolini speech to Palermo that "raised" Sicily to "the burden of being the Centre of the Empire".

Execution of the work, based on the painted study, was commissioned by the Opificio delle pietre dure from the Scuola del Mosaico of the Reverenda Fabbrica di San Pietro.

=== Station yard ===
The station yard consists of six tracks used by both passenger and freight services. From the waterfront, these tracks run past two sets of sidings, one on each side, and then fan out into ten tracks extending to the adjoining Messina Centrale station.

== Interchange ==
Messina Marittima offers interchange with ferries to Villa San Giovanni and Reggio Calabria.

Piazza della Repubblica, outside the main entrance to Messina Centrale, is a stop on the Messina tramway.

== See also ==
- History of rail transport in Italy
- List of railway stations in Sicily
- Rail transport in Italy
- Railway stations in Italy
