= Catania Centrale railway station =

Main railway station of Catania, Sicily, Italy

Catania Centrale
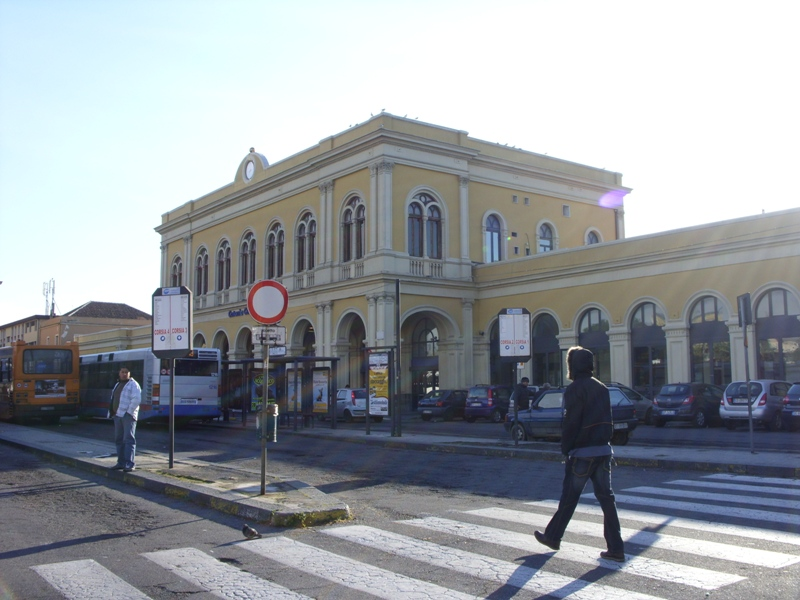
- Exterior of the station building.

General information
- Location: Piazza Papa Giovanni XXIII; 95100 Catania; Catania, Catania, Sicily; Italy
- Coordinates: 37°30′23.62″N 15°5′58.85″E
- Owner: Rete Ferroviaria Italiana
- Operator: Centostazioni
- Lines: Messina–Syracuse; Palermo–Catania; Catania–Gela; Catania–Randazzo (FCE)
- Platforms: 4 (7 tracks)
- Train operators: Trenitalia
- Connections: AMT buses

Other information
- Classification: Gold

History
- Opened: 1867; 159 years ago
Location
- Location within Sicily Location within Italy

Catania Centrale is the main railway station of the Italian city of Catania, in Sicily. Along with Palermo Centrale, Messina Centrale and Syracuse it is one of the most important stations of its region. It is managed by the Ferrovie dello Stato, the national rail company of Italy.

== History ==
The station was inaugurated on 24 June 1866. One century later it was upgraded and renewed due to the electrification of the Messina-Catania line.

== Structure and transport ==
Catania Centrale is located close to the Port of Catania and by the sea. It has a railway depot and a link to the port. The station building has two floors and a portico and is protected by the national cultural heritage.

The station is electrified and served by regional trains. For long-distance transport there are InterCity and Express trains to Rome, Turin, Milan and Venice, linking it also with Genoa, Naples, Bologna, Florence, Pisa and other cities.

== Gallery ==
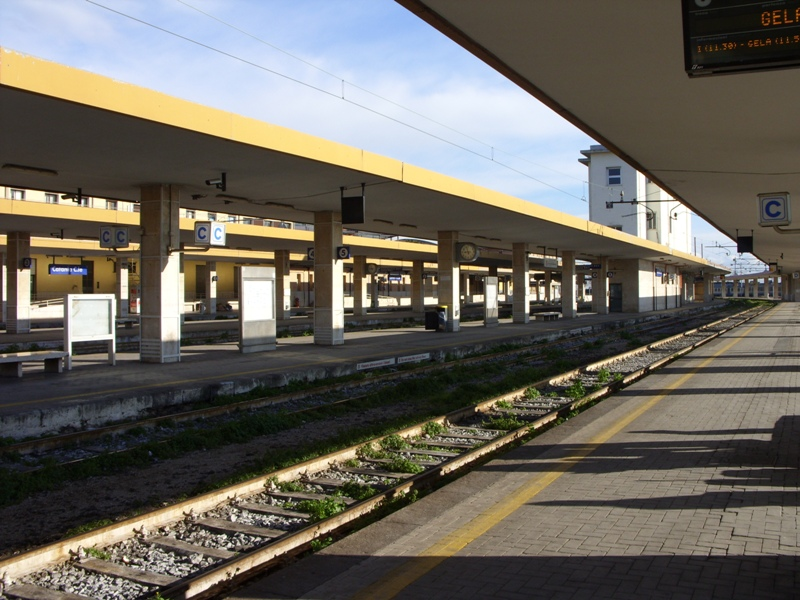
View of the platforms.

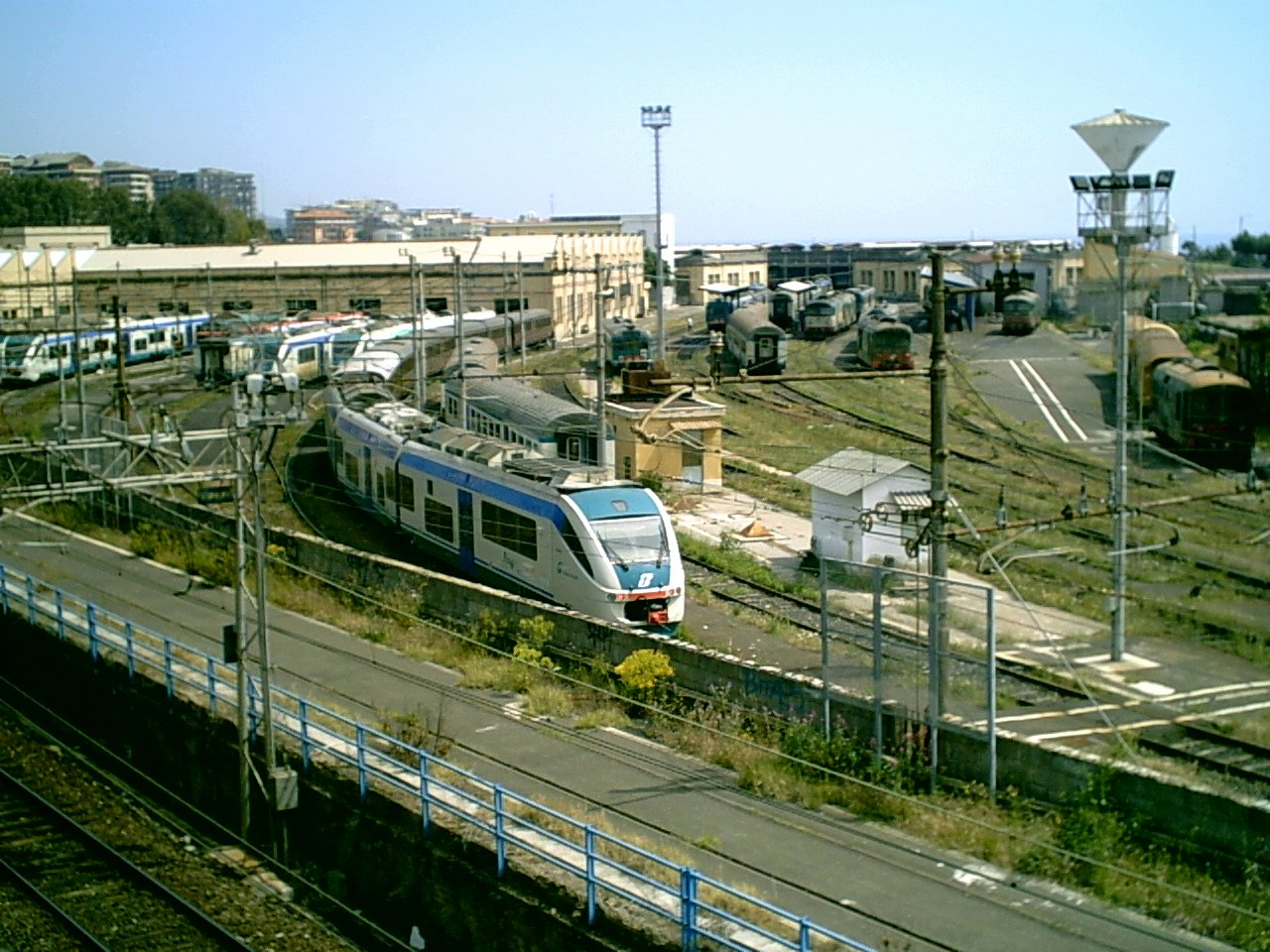
Station's depot.

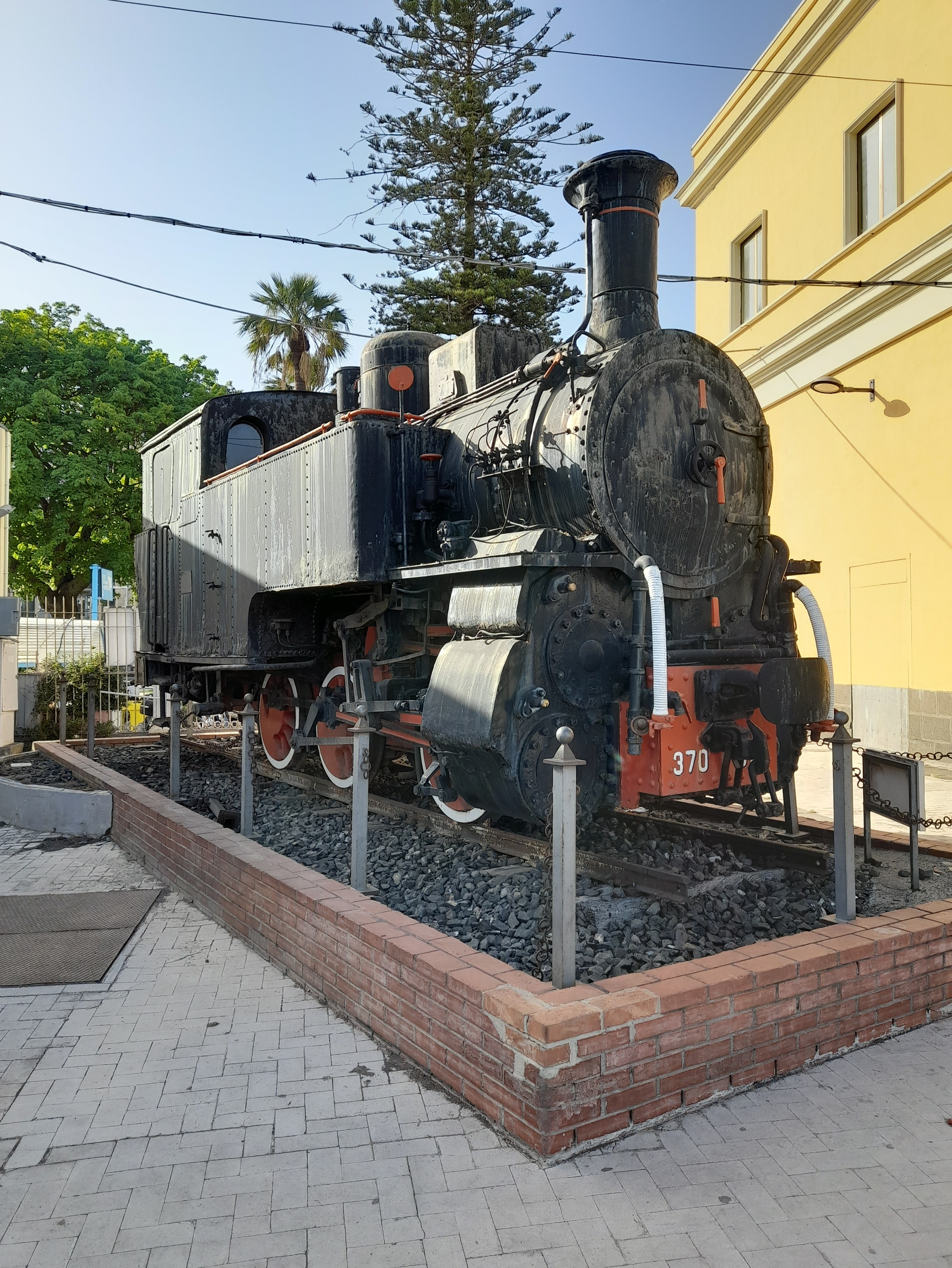
The steam locomotive and narrow gauge (950 mm), R.370.012 (series R.370), monumented at Catania Centrale railway station.

== See also ==
- List of railway stations in Sicily
- Railway stations in Italy
- Rail transport in Italy
- History of rail transport in Italy
