= Port of Messina =

Port in Sicily, Italy

Coordinates: 38°11′30″N 15°34′30″E

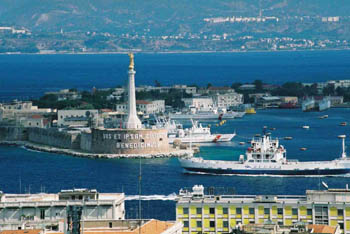
Port of Messina

Port of Messina (Italian: Porto di Messina) is a port serving Messina, Sicily, Italy. The port has seen a significant growth in traffic in the 21st century, and is now one of the largest and most important in the Mediterranean for cruise ships, growing from 260,000 passengers in 2006 to 405,000 in 2009.

The port opens on the western shore of the Strait of Messina, and is made up of a large inlet of the natural harbour, that borders an area of around 820,000 m^{2}. The port areas, however, only occupy about 50 hectares. The harbour entrance in the northwest is about 400 meters wide, and the average depth of the basin (about 100 meters from the docks) is 40 meters. This allows for the access and docking of large ships. The docks are equipped with both fixed and mobile cranes, and are linked by rail through Messina Centrale and Messina Marittima railway stations.

The Port Authority of Messina (Autorità Portuale di Messina) operates the port. In 2016 the Port Authority was criticised by the European Court of Justice for the procedures followed when letting a waste management services contract for handling waste and cargo residues on ships. The authority had excluded a suitable company from the possibility of being awarded the contract because the company had not paid a fee said to be due to the Supervisory Authority on Public Procurement (AVCP). The need to pay the fee was not mentioned in the contract documents and the legal provision underlying this fee applied expressly to public works contracts and not service contracts. The "broad interpretation" of the law in Italian practice and national administrative case law was held to be a matter which non-Italian companies could not be expected to be aware of and therefore the undisclosed requirement to pay the fee was held to be discriminatory and non-transparent.
