= Giampilieri railway station =

Railway station in Giampilieri, Sicily

Giampilieri
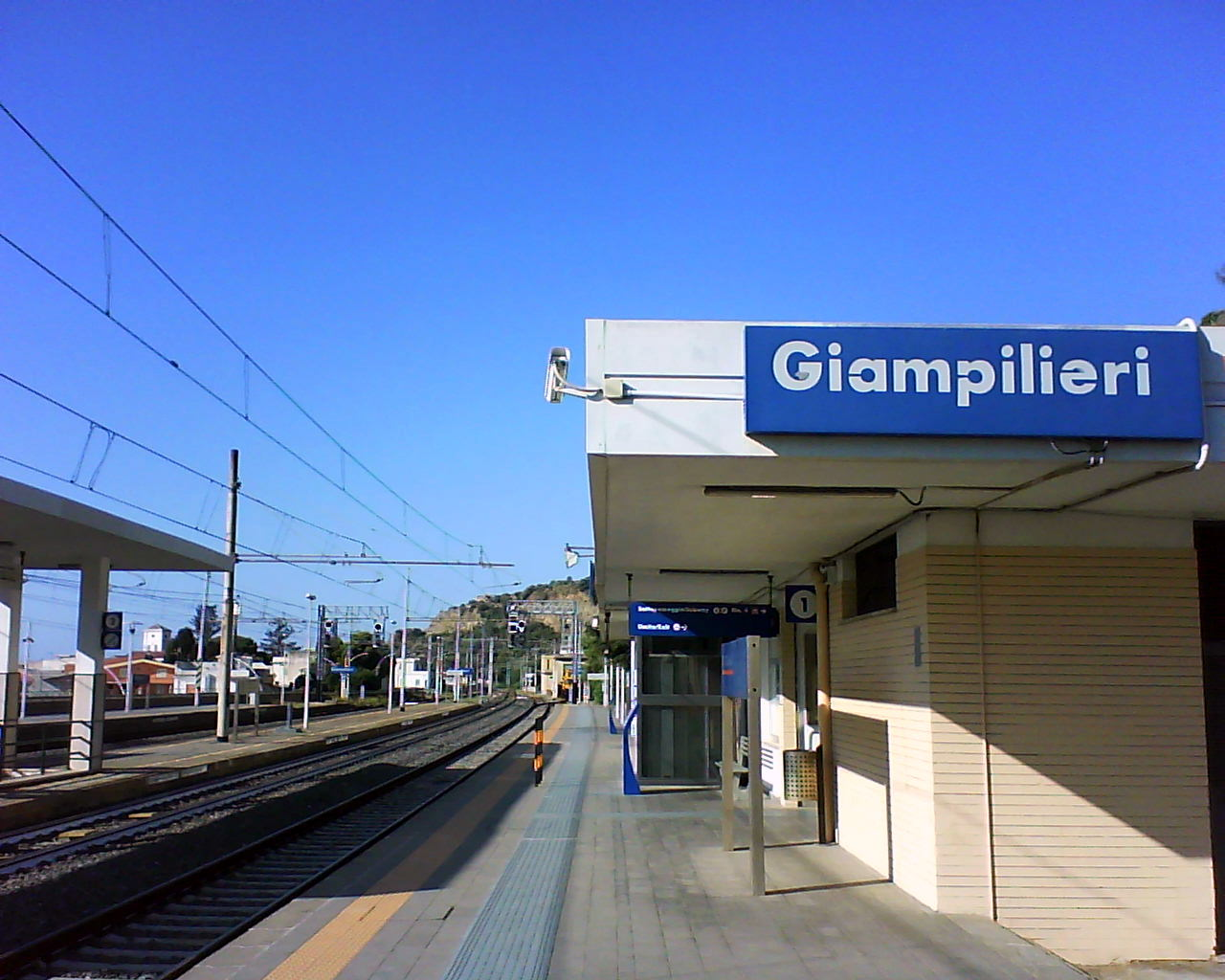
- Giampilieri station, south side

General information
- Location: Messina, Sicily; Italy
- Coordinates: 38°11′6.48″N 15°33′39.35″E
- Owner: Rete Ferroviaria Italiana
- Operator: Centostazioni
- Lines: Messina–Syracuse
- Platforms: 2 (3 tracks)
- Train operators: Trenitalia
- Connections: Messina Suburban Railway; ATM buses

Construction
- Structure type: surface station, passing through

Other information
- Classification: Railway stations in Italy

History
- Opened: 1866; 160 years ago
Location
- Location within Sicily Location within Italy

Giampilieri Station is a railway station on the Messina-Syracuse line. It serves the town of Giampilieri Marina, a hamlet in the municipality of Messina. The double track from Messina to Syracuse terminates here and then resumes from Fiumefreddo di Sicilia to Catania.

== Recent History ==
On December 14, 2008, the new stops at Fiumara Gazzi, Mili Marina, Ponte Santo Stefano, Ponte Schiavo, and San Paolo were opened. These stops were served by trains from the Giampilieri-Messina Metroferrovia starting on June 15 of the following year.

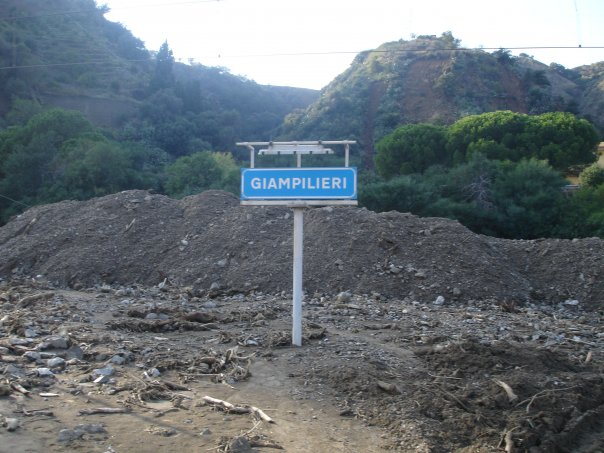
Giampilieri station tracks after the landslide of October 1, 2009.

In October 2009, the station was hit by a landslide flood that interrupted the Messina-Syracuse line for several days.

For the Messina-Catania line – an electrified double track connection between Fiumefreddo-Giampilieri section work began in 2022 and completion is scheduled for December 2029. The station is connected to the city centre by two ATM bus lines: line no. 1 Shuttle (Lighthouse Tower - Central Station - Giampilieri Superiore) and line no. 2 shuttle (Briga - Giampilieri Superiore - Altolia).

== See also ==
- Messina Centrale railway station
