= Gela railway station =

Railway station in Italy

Gela
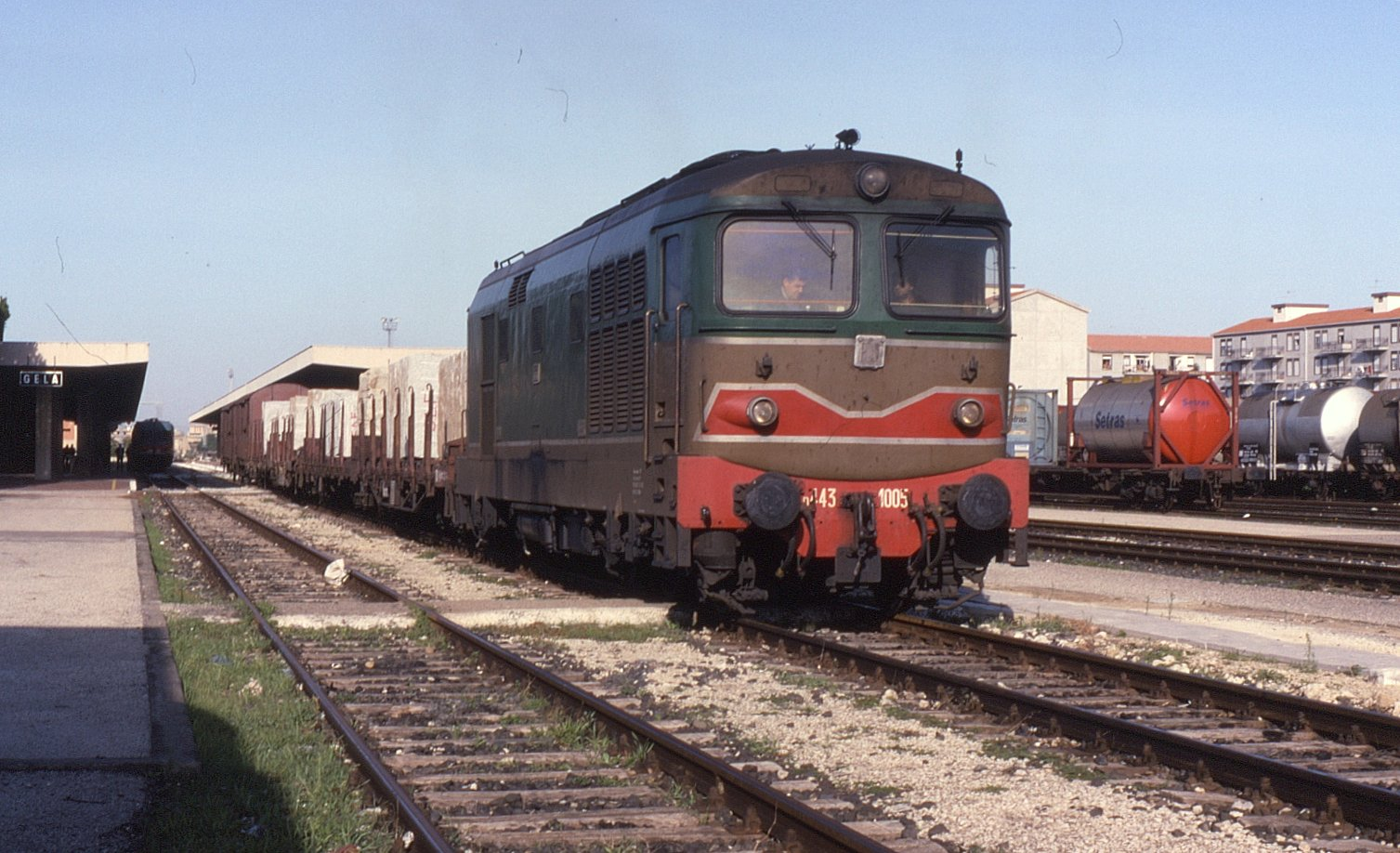
- D.443 locomotive in Gela

General information
- Location: Piazzale Stazione; 93012 Gela (CL); Gela, Caltanissetta, Sicily; Italy
- Coordinates: 37°04′21.69″N 14°15′33.8″E
- Owner: Rete Ferroviaria Italiana
- Lines: Siracusa-Gela-Canicattì; Catania-Caltagirone-Gela
- Platforms: 3 (5 tracks)
- Train operators: Trenitalia
- Connections: Urban and suburban buses

Other information
- Classification: Silver

History
- Opened: 1891; 135 years ago
- Rebuilt: 1977
Location
- Location within Sicily Location within Italy

Gela is the main railway station of the Italian city of Gela, in the Province of Caltanissetta, Sicily. It is owned by the Ferrovie dello Stato, the national rail company of Italy.

== History ==
The current station was inaugurated in 1977, substituting the original 1891 station, inaugurated after the opening of the line from Syracuse station. The new, larger station, was built in the north of the city when the site of the old station was repurposed by a road construction project. 4th century BC artefacts were found during the works.

== Structure and transport ==
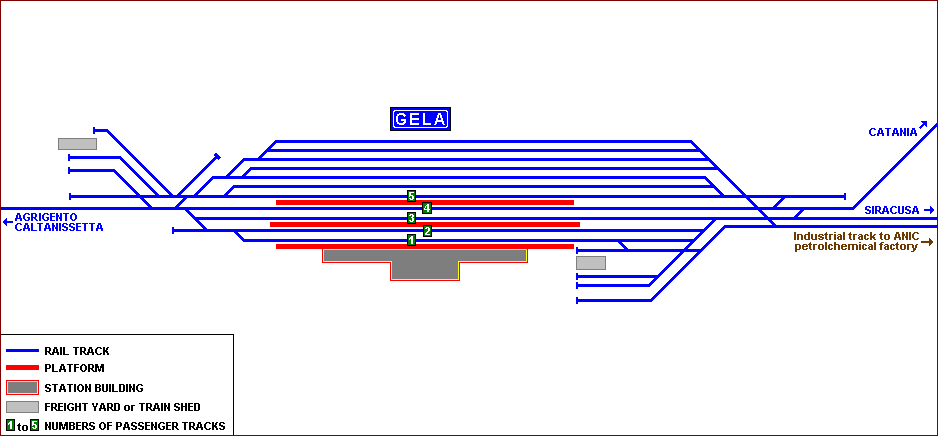
Schematic map of the station

The new Gela station is a modern one-floor building. There is a bus terminus and a large car park. There are 3 platforms and a total of 11 tracks: 5 are used for passenger services, the others only for goods. Due Gela is the biggest station on the line from Syracuse to Agrigento and Caltanissetta, and one of the most important hubs for freight traffic in Sicily.

The station is not electrified. and served by regional trains. It is connected to Ragusa, Syracuse, Catania, Palermo, Caltagirone, Canicattì, Licata, Caltanissetta and periodically to Agrigento. Only the line to Syracuse is still open for passenger trains. The other lines are only used by freight trains. Back in the 1990s there was a long-distance connection to Rome and Naples by the 'Rome-Ragusa' Express.

== Other town stations ==
In the town there are also two halts: Gela Anic serves the ANIC petrolchemical factory; Gela Lago, closed, is located near the Biviere di Gela nature reserve. Two other halts within the municipal boundaries, Piana del Signore and Priolo Sottano, are out of service.

== See also ==
- Railway stations in Italy
- List of railway stations in Sicily
- Rail transport in Italy
- History of rail transport in Italy
