= Messina Centrale railway station =

Railway station in Messina, Italy

Messina Centrale
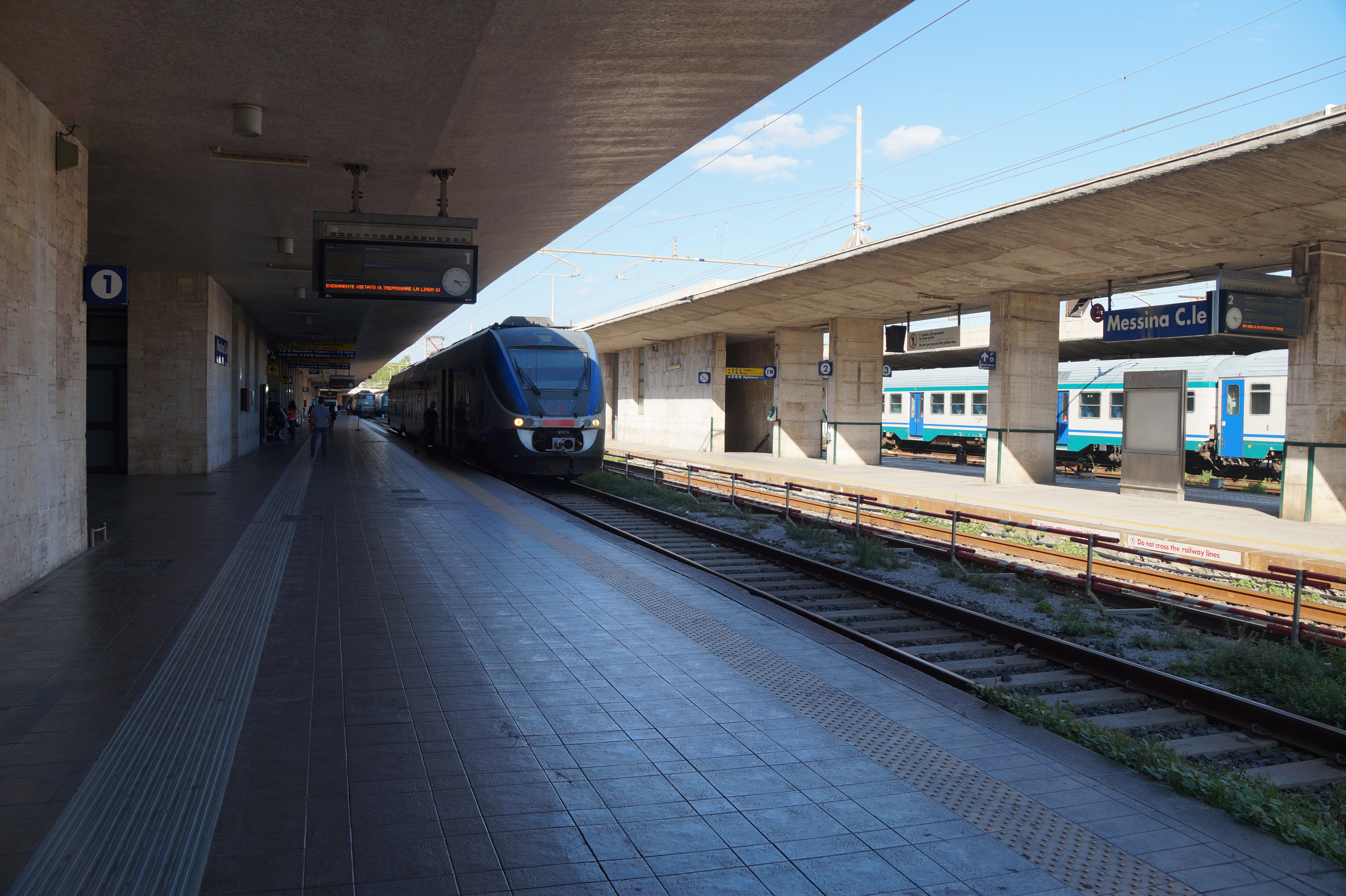
- View over some of the platforms

General information
- Location: Piazza della Repubblica; 98100 Messina; Messina, Messina, Sicily; Italy
- Coordinates: 38°11′6.48″N 15°33′39.35″E
- Owner: Rete Ferroviaria Italiana
- Operator: Centostazioni
- Lines: Palermo–Messina; Messina–Syracuse
- Platforms: 5 (9 tracks)
- Train operators: Trenitalia
- Connections: Messina Suburban Railway; ATM trams; ATM buses

Other information
- Classification: Gold

History
- Opened: 1866; 160 years ago

Services
Preceding station	Trenitalia	Following station
Villa San Giovanni via train ferry towards Milano Centrale	InterCity Notte; Milan–Syracuse	Taormina–Giardini towards Siracusa
Location
- Location within Sicily Location within Italy

Messina Centrale railway station (Italian: Stazione di Messina Centrale or Messina Centrale) is the main railway station of the Italian city of Messina in Sicily. As Palermo Centrale, Catania Centrale and Syracuse it is one of the most important stations of its region. It is owned by the Ferrovie dello Stato, the national rail company of Italy.

== History ==
The station, originally named simply as Messina, was inaugurated on 12 December 1866, as the terminal of the railway to Taormina, the first section of the Messina-Catania-Siracusa line. Heavily damaged after the 1908 earthquake, it was repaired a few years later. In 1939 it was finally renewed and replaced by the modern Messina Centrale, with the station building projected by the architect Angiolo Mazzoni.

== Train services ==
The station is served by the following service(s):

- Intercity services Rome - Naples - Messina - Palermo
- Intercity services Rome - Naples - Messina - Catania - Siracusa
- Night train service (Intercity Night) Rome - Naples - Messina - Palermo
- Night train service (Intercity Night) Rome - Naples - Messina - Catania - Siracusa
- Night train service ( Intercity Night ) Milan - Genoa - Salerno - Messina - Palermo
- Night train service ( Intercity Night ) Milan - Genoa - Salerno - Messina - Catania - Siracusa
- Regional services (Treno regionale) Messina - Palermo
- Regional services (Treno regionale) Messina - Giarre-Riposto - Catania - Siracusa
- Local services (Treno regionale) Messina - Patti
- Local services (Treno regionale) Messina - Giampilieri

== Structure and transport ==
The new station building was projected following the modern criteria of the futurist architect Angiolo Mazzoni, and is extended through the stations square. Messina Centrale station is at almost contiguous with Messina Marittima station, located by the historic port and constituting a ferry ships, which carry trains in the Strait of Messina to Villa San Giovanni station and vice versa.

Since May 1, 2019, Blu Jet, an RFI company, has been carrying passengers by sea across the Strait of Messina using high-speed vessels on the Messina Porto Storico-Villa San Giovanni route.

The station is electrified and served by regional trains, by a Messina Suburban Railway to Giampilieri with single ticket and new metro fare. and by the modern Messina tramway (at "Repubblica" stop, on station's square), opened in 2003. For long-distance transport it counts some InterCity and Express trains to Rome, Turin, Milan and Venice, linking it also with Genoa, Naples, Bologna, Florence, Pisa and other cities. It is also part of the projected Berlin–Palermo railway axis.

== Photogallery ==
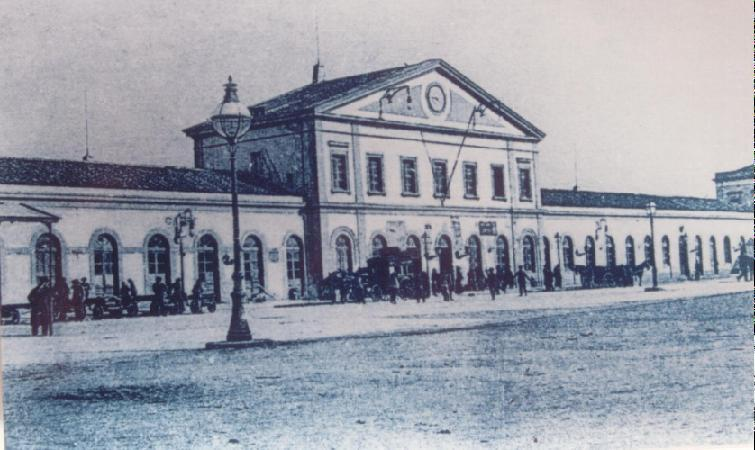
The old station building before 1908 Messina earthquake

Map of the tramway showing station's position

== See also ==
- Messina Marittima railway station
- Strait of Messina Bridge
- List of railway stations in Sicily
- Railway stations in Italy
- Rail transport in Italy
- History of rail transport in Italy
