= Siracusa railway station =

Railway station in Syracuse, Italy

Siracusa
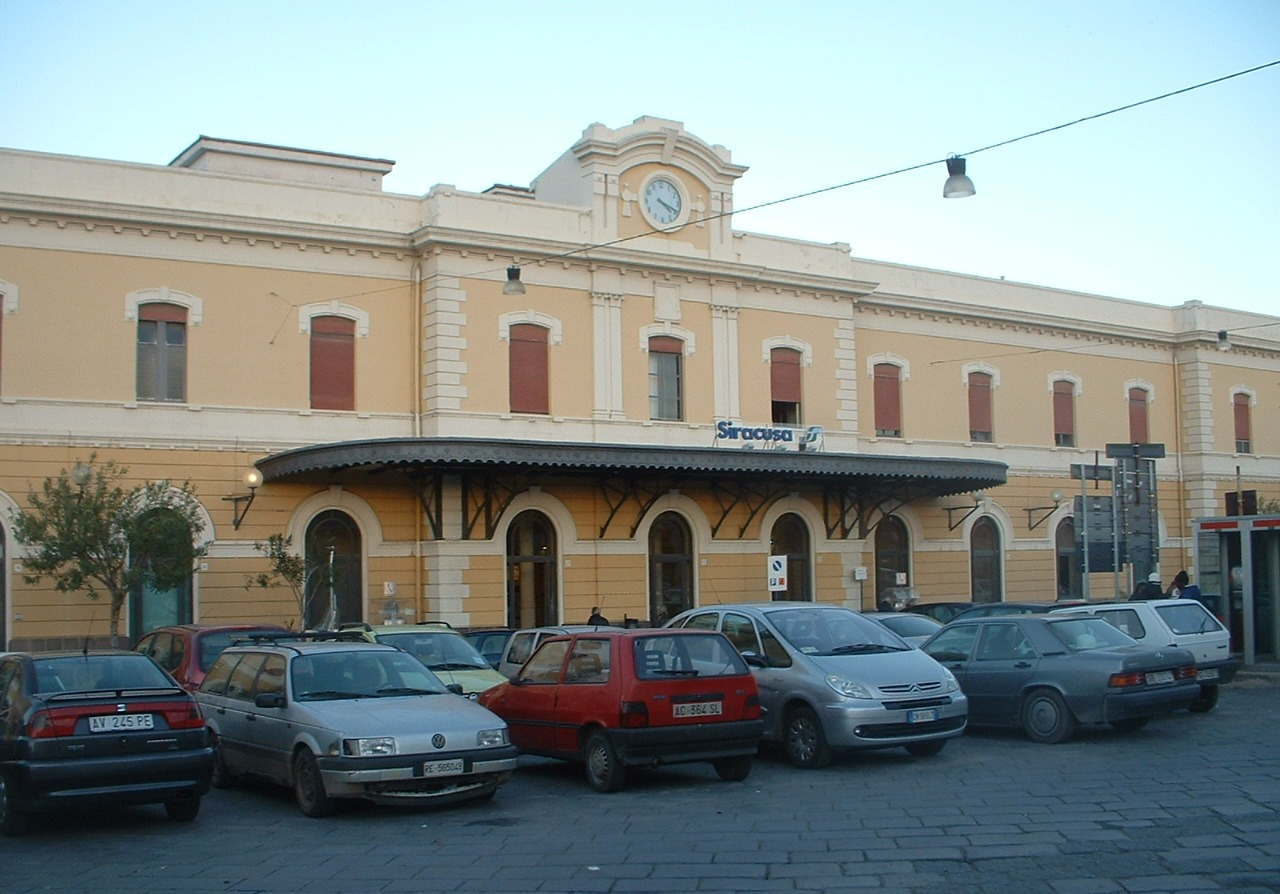
- View of the station building

General information
- Location: Piazzale Stazione; 96100 Siracusa; Syracuse, Syracuse, Sicily; Italy
- Coordinates: 37°04′7.76″N 15°16′50.64″E
- Owner: Rete Ferroviaria Italiana
- Lines: Messina–Syracuse; Siracusa-Gela-Canicattì; Siracusa-Ragusa/Vizzini
- Platforms: 5 (9 tracks)
- Train operators: Trenitalia
- Connections: Urban and suburban buses

Other information
- Classification: Silver

History
- Opened: 1871; 155 years ago

Services
Preceding station	Trenitalia	Following station
Augusta towards Milano Centrale	InterCity Notte; Milan–Syracuse	Terminus
Location
- Location within Sicily Location within Italy

Siracusa is the main railway station of the Italian city of Syracuse (It.: Siracusa), in Sicily. Like Palermo Centrale, Catania Centrale and Messina Centrale it is one of the most important stations in Sicily. It is owned by the Ferrovie dello Stato, the national rail company of Italy.

== History ==
The station was inaugurated on 19 January 1871 as the southern terminal of the line from Messina and Catania. On 13 August 1892 a short rail connection to the port and the station of Siracusa Marittima was opened, originally named Siracusa Porto, not used for passenger traffic. The original building of Siracusa Porto remains but the tracks have mostly disappeared and the area is now a car park. At the end of the 1990s, on the line from Catania, a new double-track siding from Targia with a tunnel under the city was built, causing the closure of the historical line and of the Syracusan station of Santa Panagia. Nowadays, except for the station of Targia, located in the petrochemical park in the north of the city, this station is the only one serving Syracuse. Some online maps still show the old railway lines including Google Maps. Other rail stops located in the municipality are situated in the villages of Santa Teresa Longarini, Fontane Bianche and Cassibile.

== Structure and transport ==
Siracusa station is located in south of the city, in the area of the port and close to the island of Ortygia. Its building has 2 floors. After the closure of the line via Santa Panagia, passing in the eastern side of the city, the station became a terminus.

The station is electrified, but not on the line to Ragusa and Gela, and served by regional trains. Mainly connected to Ragusa, Gela Catania and Messina, it is periodically linked to Palermo. For long-distance transport Siracusa is the southern terminal of InterCity and Express trains to Rome, Turin, Milan and Venice, linking it also with Genoa, Naples, Bologna, Florence, Pisa and other cities. There are around 10 trains a day to Catania and Messina, several trains heading south towards Gela and one or two to Rome and beyond. There is a daily night service in both directions between Rome and Syracuse.

== Facilities ==
There are several ticket offices and automatic machines. There is a small café, tobacconists and a police station.

== Photogallery ==
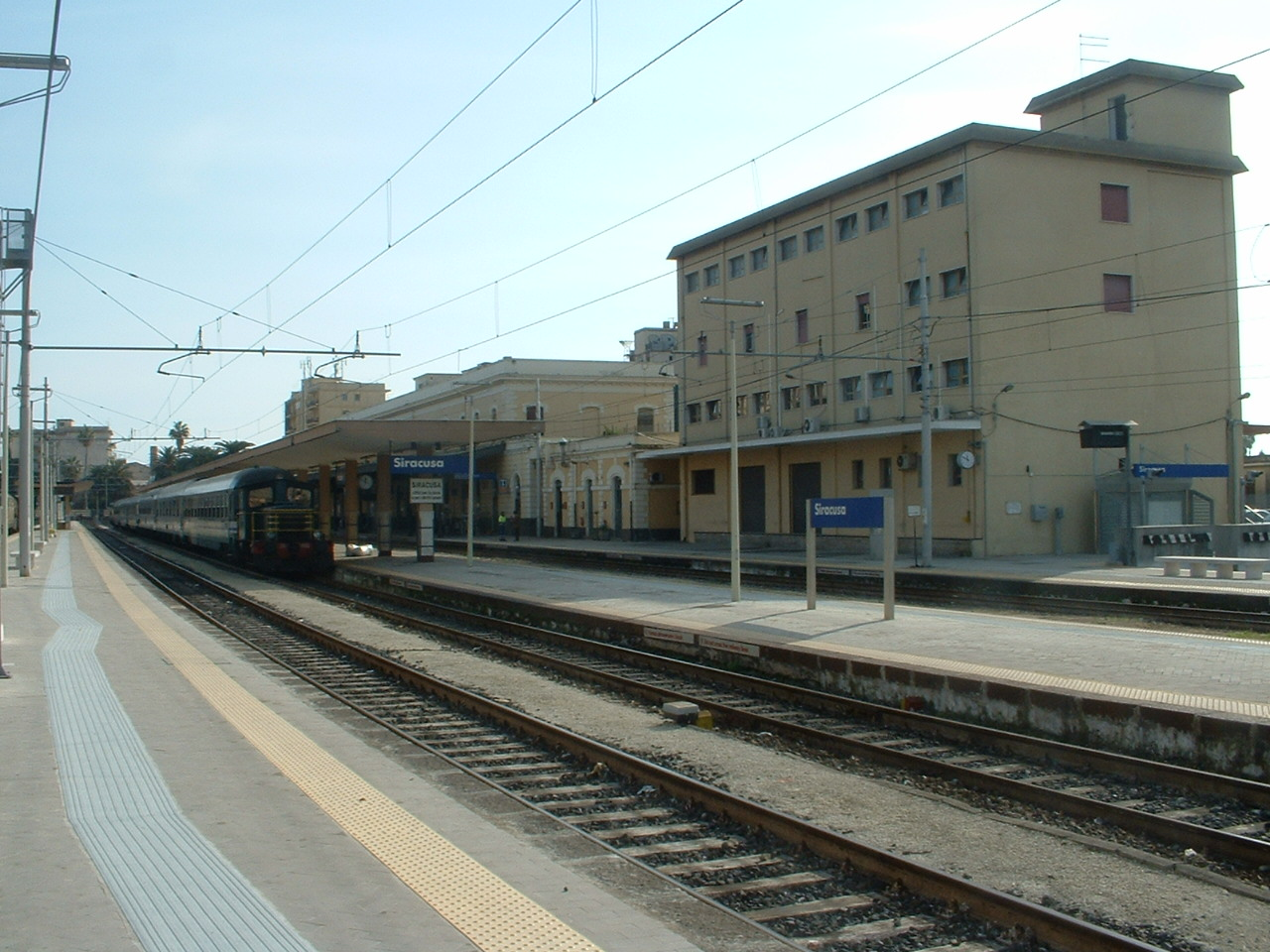
View of the platforms and the station building

== See also ==
- Railway stations in Italy
- List of railway stations in Sicily
- Rail transport in Italy
- History of rail transport in Italy
