= Trams in Messina =

Tramway services in Messina, Sicily, Italy

Coordinates: 38°11′08″N 15°33′38″E

Messina tramway
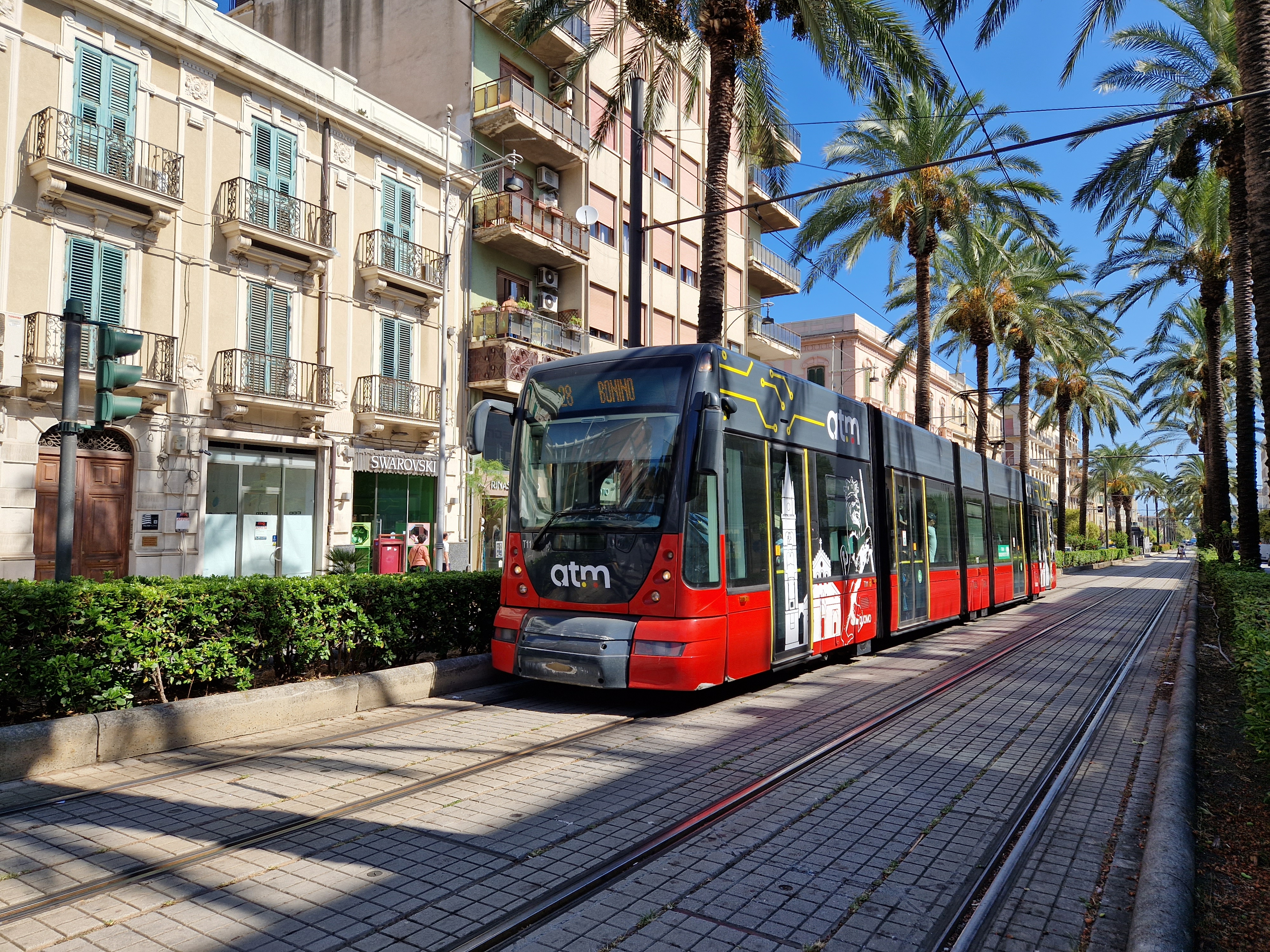
- Tram no T11 in Messina

Operation
- Locale: Messina, Sicily, Italy
- Open: 3 April 2003
- Lines: 1
- Operator: ATM (Messina)

Statistics
- Route length: 7.7 km (4.8 mi)
- Stops: 18
Overview
- Website: https://www.atmmessinaspa.it/servizio_tram.php?tipo=1 ATM Messina (in Italian)

The Messina tramway (Italian: Tranvia di Messina) is a tramway forming part of the public transport system in Messina, a city and comune in the region of Sicily, Italy.

In operation since 2003, the tramway is 7.7 km (4.8 mi) long, and comprises one line, linking Gazzi with Annunziata.

== History ==
Trams returned to Messina on 3 April 2003, after a long gestation and construction period. Messina's earlier urban tramway network had been disposed of more than half a century earlier, following the closure of its last line in 1951.

The new tramway line replaced the former bus line no 28.

The southern terminus of the new tramway, at Gazzi, was activated later; initially, the tram stop at Bonino marked the southern end of the line.

== Rolling stock ==
The tram service is provided by 15 modern 5-section Alstom Cityway articulated trams.

== See also ==
- Messina Centrale railway station
- List of town tramway systems in Italy
- History of rail transport in Italy
- Rail transport in Italy
