= Messina–Syracuse railway =

Railway line in Italy

Overview
- Native name: Ferrovia Messina-Siracusa
- Termini: Messina Centrale railway station; Syracuse railway station
- Stations: 39

Service
- Type: heavy rail
- Operator: Rete Ferroviaria Italiana

Technical
- Number of tracks: 2 (Messina Centrale–Giampilieri; Fiumefreddo–Catania Centrale; Catania Acquicella–Bicocca; Targia–Syracuse); 1 (Giampilieri–Fiumefreddo; Catania Centrale–Catania Acquicella; Bicocca–Targia)
- Track gauge: 1,435 mm (4 ft 8 1/2 in)
- Electrification: 3 kV DC, overhead line
- Operating speed: 150 km/h (93 mph)
Route map
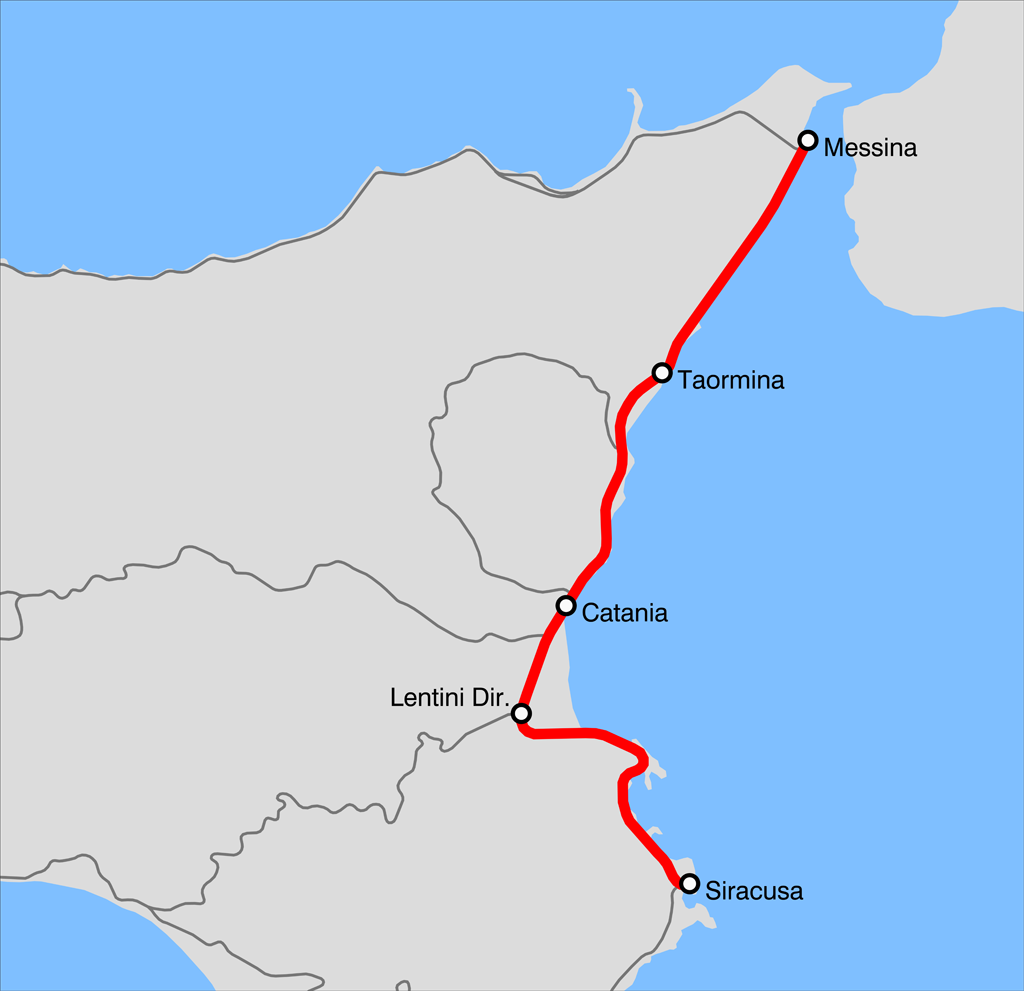

Messina–Syracuse railway is a railway line in Sicily, Italy.

== History ==
The line was opened in different parts:

Opening date	Line part
12 December 1866	Messina–Giardini-Taormina
3 January 1867	Giardini-Taormina–Catania
1 July 1869	Catania–Lentini
19 January 1871	Lentini–Siracusa

On 21 January 2026 all railway traffic on the line was temporarily suspended as a result of damage caused by Storm Harry which struck the coast of eastern Sicily 20 January. Beginning on 24 January limited service resumed between Syracuse and Giardini- Taormina. However traffic remains suspended between Giardini-Taormina and Messina due to damaged tracks. It is unknown when service will resume.

== See also ==
- List of railway lines in Italy
