= Outline of Palermo =

Overview of and topical guide to Palermo

Flag of Palermo

The following outline is provided as an overview of and topical guide to Palermo:

Palermo – city of Southern Italy, the capital of both the autonomous region of Sicily and the Metropolitan City of Palermo. The city is noted for its history, culture, architecture and gastronomy, playing an important role throughout much of its existence; it is over 2,700 years old. Palermo is located in the northwest of the island of Sicily, right by the Gulf of Palermo in the Tyrrhenian Sea. The city was founded in 734 BC by the Phoenicians. Palermo then became a possession of Carthage, before becoming part of the Roman Republic, the Roman Empire and eventually part of the Byzantine Empire, for over a thousand years. From 831 to 1072 the city was under Arab rule during the Emirate of Sicily when the city first became a capital. Following the Norman reconquest, Palermo became the capital of a new kingdom (from 1130 to 1816), the Kingdom of Sicily and the capital of the Holy Roman Empire under Emperor Frederick II and King Conrad IV. Palermo is Sicily's cultural, economic and tourism capital. It is a city rich in history, culture, art, music and food. Numerous tourists are attracted to the city for its good Mediterranean weather, its renowned gastronomy and restaurants, its Romanesque, Gothic and Baroque churches, palaces and buildings, and its nightlife and music. Palermo is the main Sicilian industrial and commercial center: the main industrial sectors include tourism, services, commerce and agriculture.

== General reference ==
- Pronunciation: /pəˈlɛərmoʊ, pəˈlɜːrmoʊ/, Italian: [paˈlɛrmo]; Sicilian: Palermu [paˈlɛmmʊ]; Latin: Panormus, from Greek: Πάνορμος
- Common English name(s): Palermo
- Official English name(s): City of Palermo
- Adjectival(s): Palermitan
- Demonym(s): Palermitan

== Geography of Palermo ==
Geography of Palermo

- Palermo is:
  - a city
    - capital of Sicily
    - capital of Metropolitan City of Palermo
- Population of Palermo:
  - City: 676,118
  - Metro: 1,300,000
- Area of Palermo: 158.9 km^{2} (61.4 sq mi)
- Atlas of Palermo

=== Location of Palermo ===
Palermo (Italy)
- Palermo is situated within the following regions:
  - Northern Hemisphere and Eastern Hemisphere
  - Eurasia
    - Europe (outline)
      - Western Europe
      - Southern Europe
        - Italian Peninsula
          - Italy (outline)
            - Southern Italy
              - Sicily
                - Metropolitan City of Palermo
- Time zone(s): Central European Time (UTC+01), Central European Summer Time (UTC+02)

=== Environment of Palermo ===
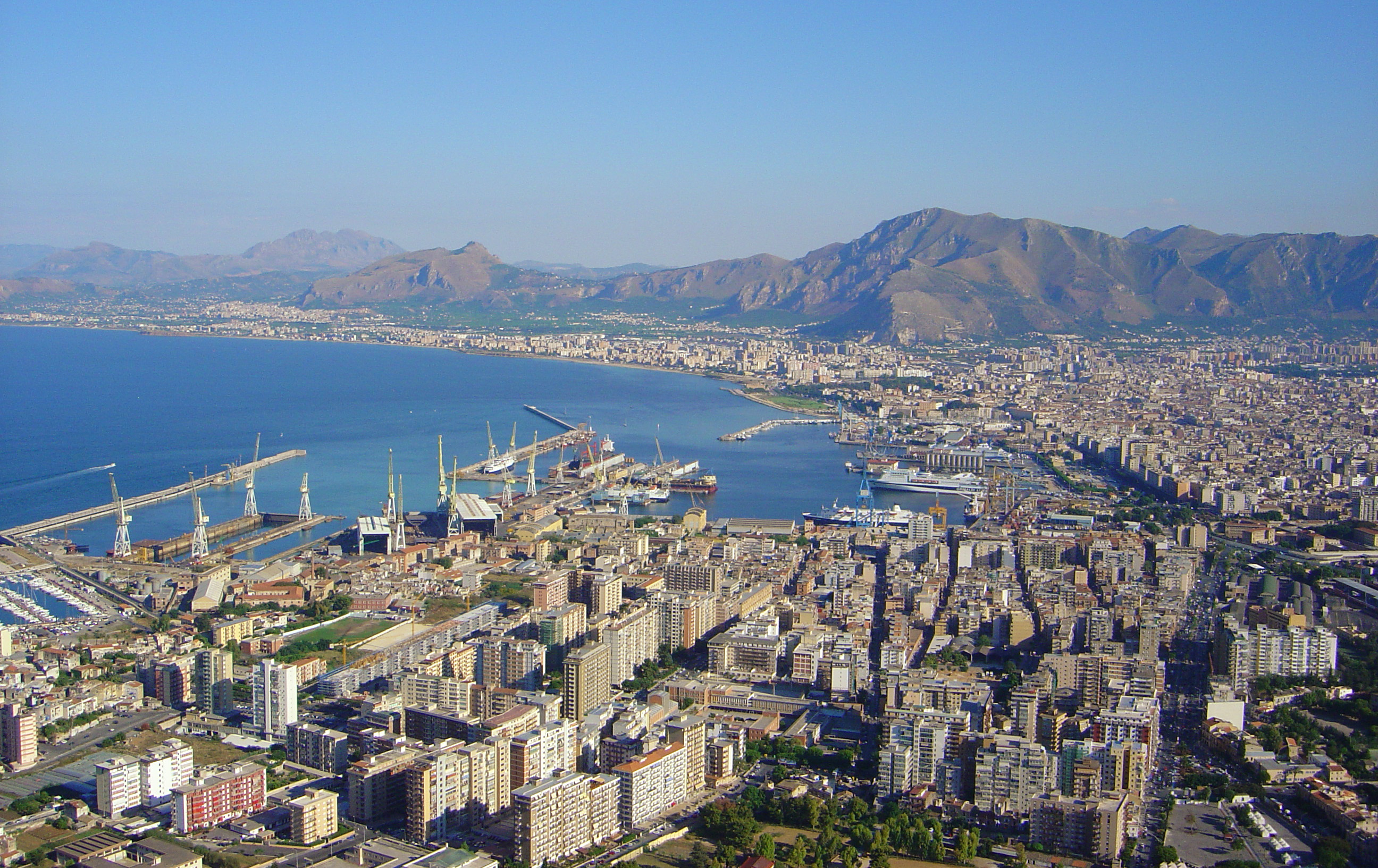
Aerial view of Palermo

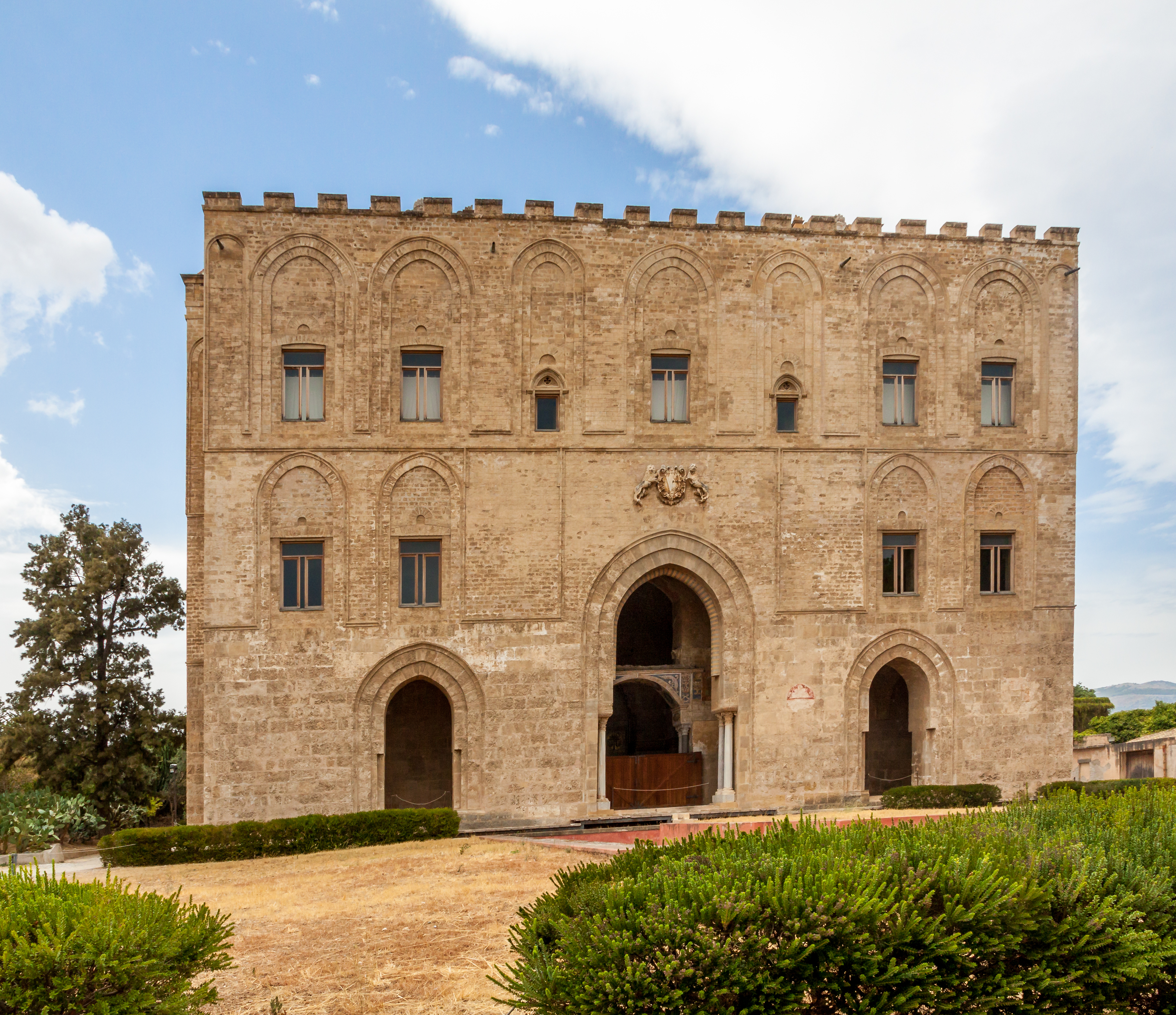
The Zisa castle, a World Heritage Site

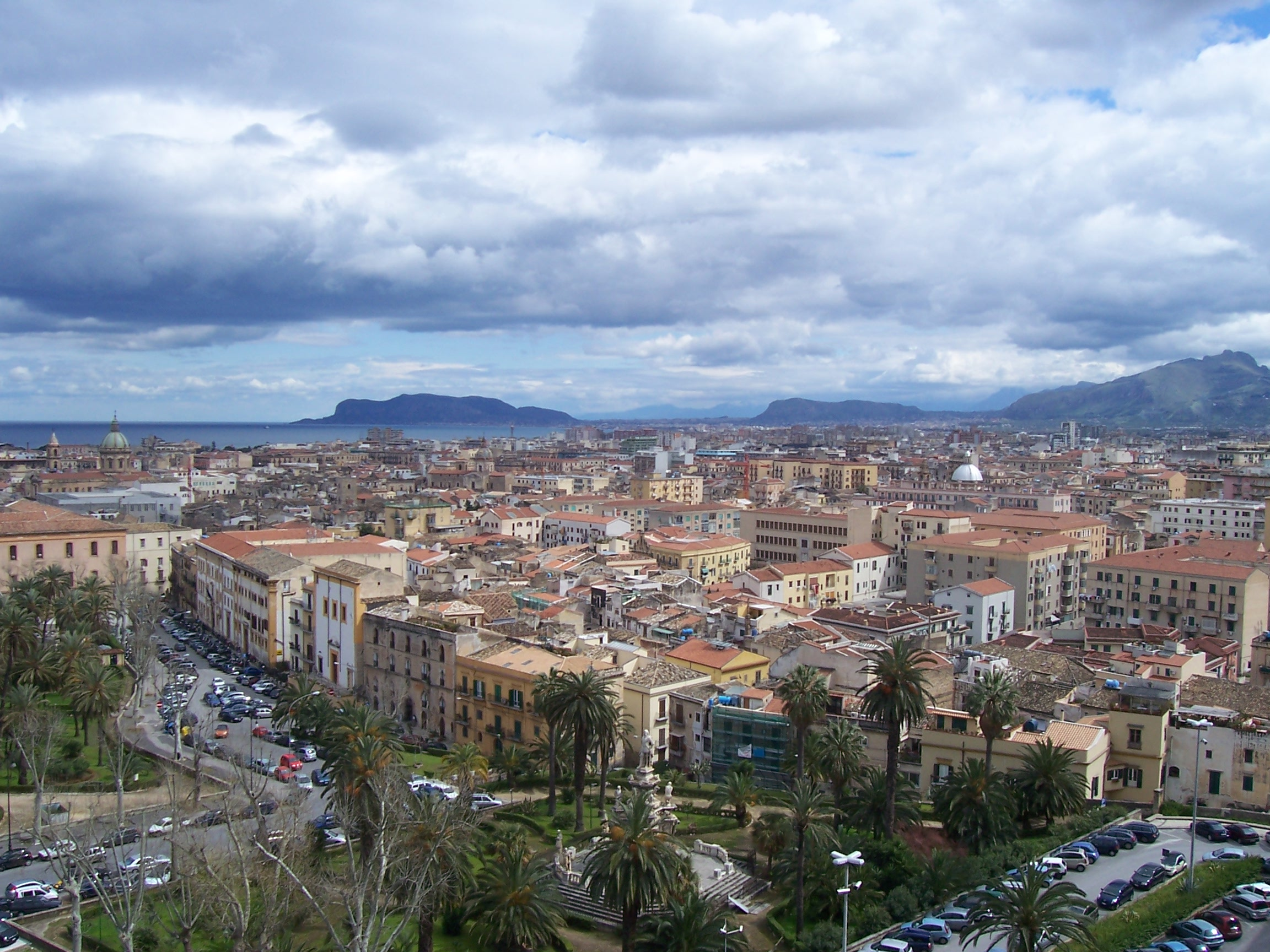
Palermo as seen from Palazzo dei Normanni

- Climate of Palermo

==== Natural geographic features of Palermo ====
- Hills in Palermo
  - Mount Pellegrino
- Rivers in Palermo
  - Oreto River
- World Heritage Sites in Palermo
  - Cappella Palatina
  - Church of San Cataldo
  - Martorana
  - Palazzo dei Normanni
  - Palermo Cathedral
  - Ponte dell'Ammiraglio
  - San Giovanni degli Eremiti
  - Zisa

=== Areas of Palermo ===
==== Districts of Palermo ====
- Districts of Palermo

==== Neighborhoods in Palermo ====
- Brancaccio
- Ciaculli
- Guadagna
- Kalsa
- ZEN (Palermo)

=== Locations in Palermo ===
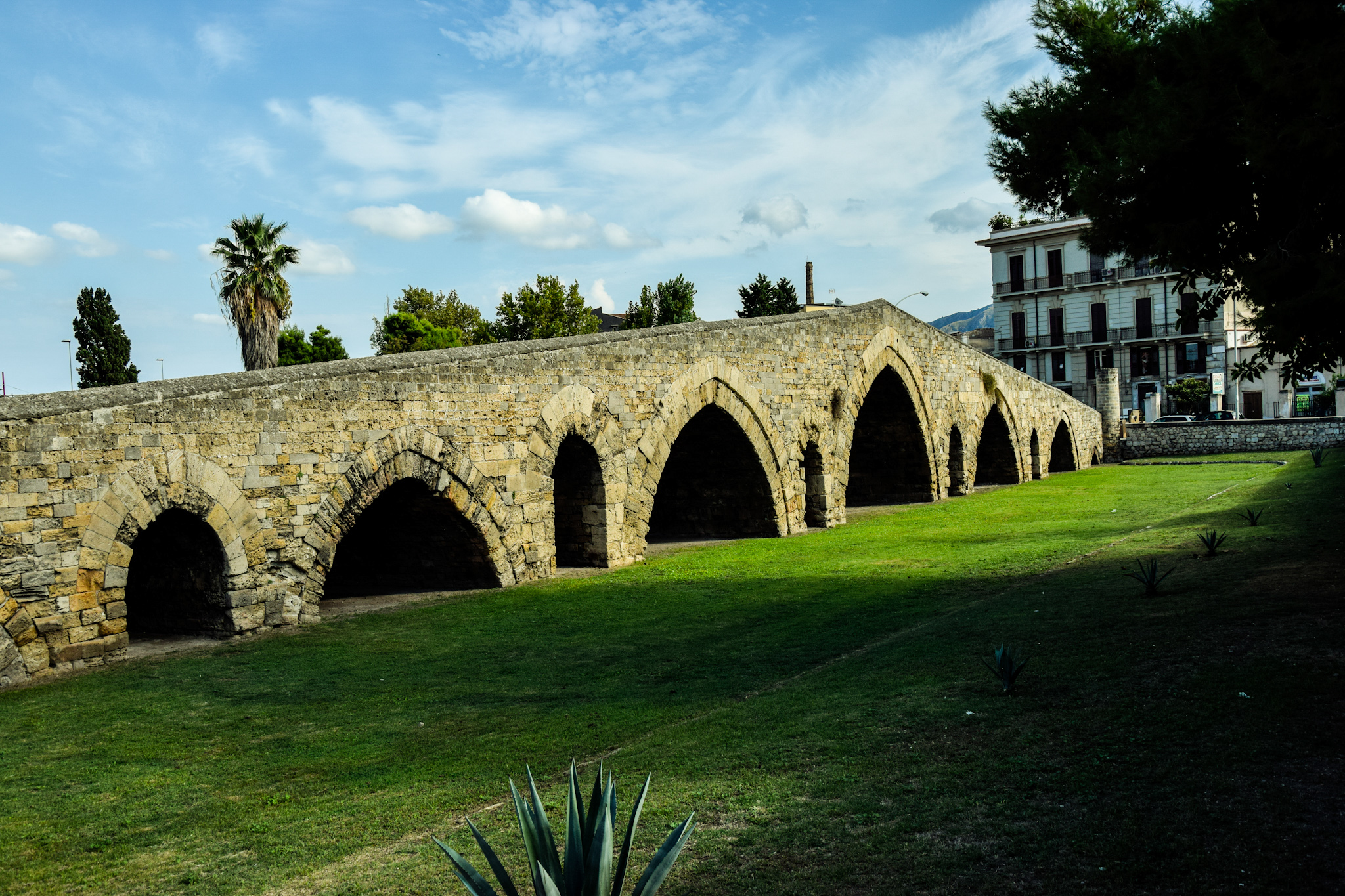
Ponte dell'Ammiraglio

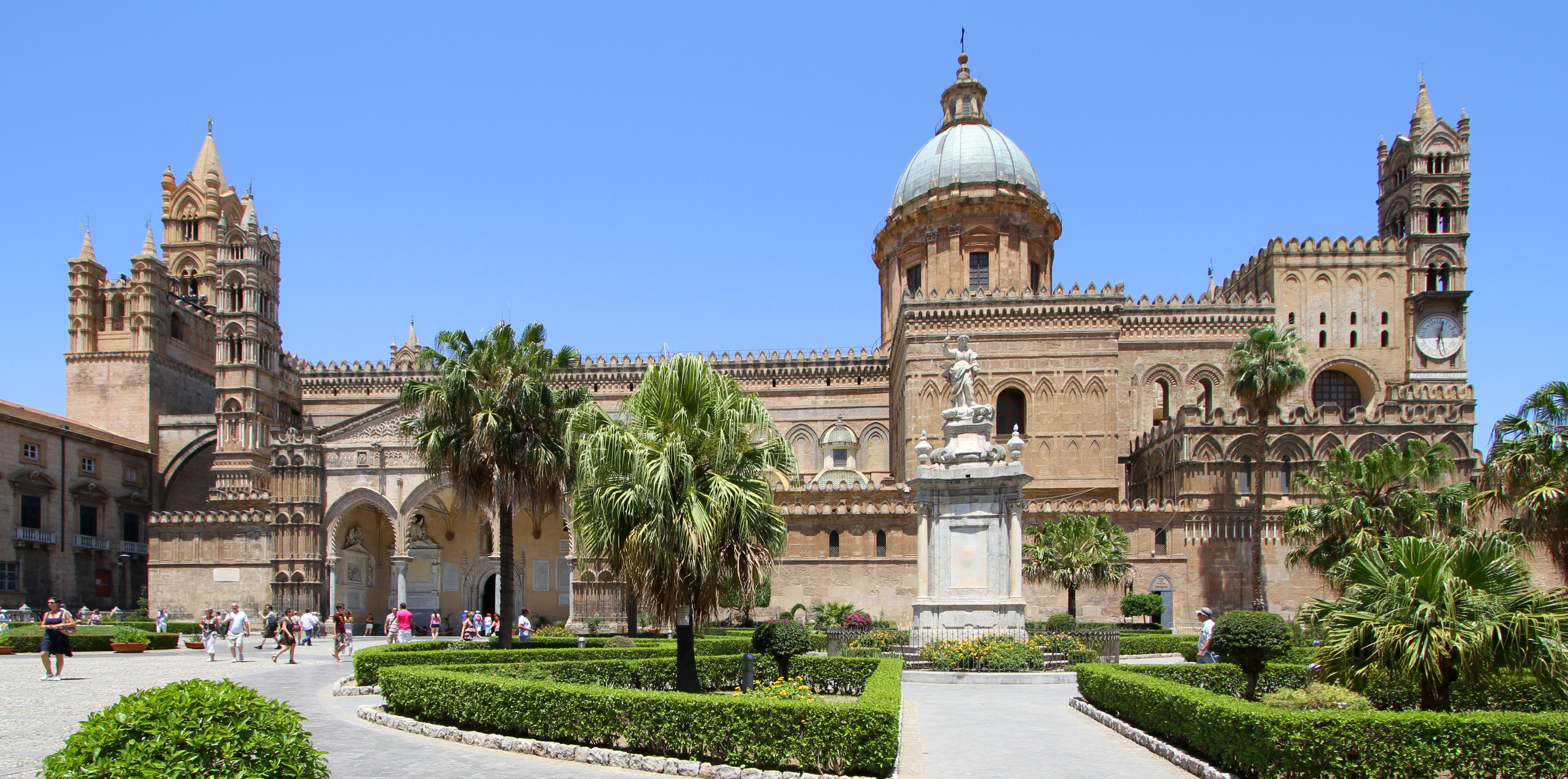
Palermo Cathedral

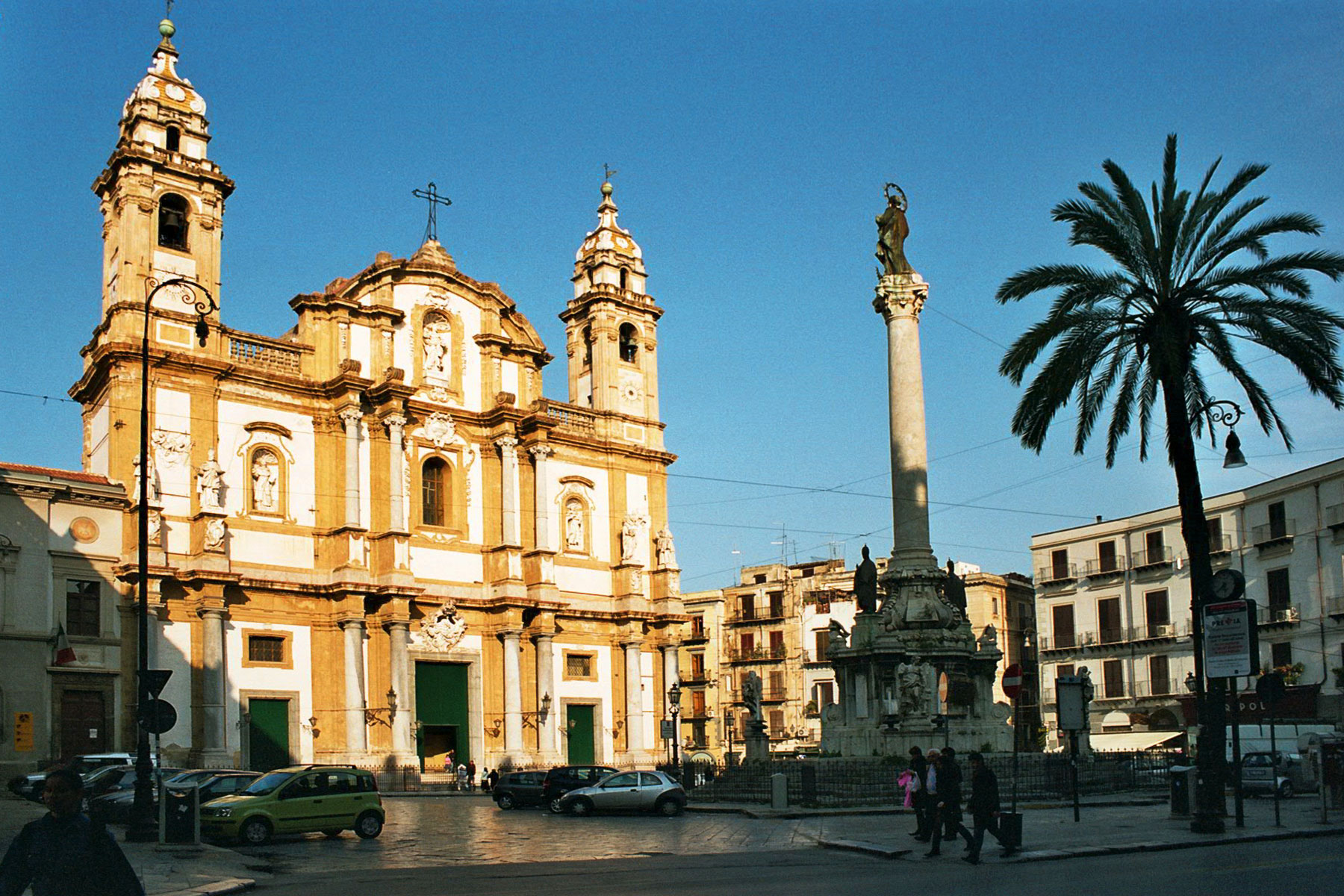
San Domenico

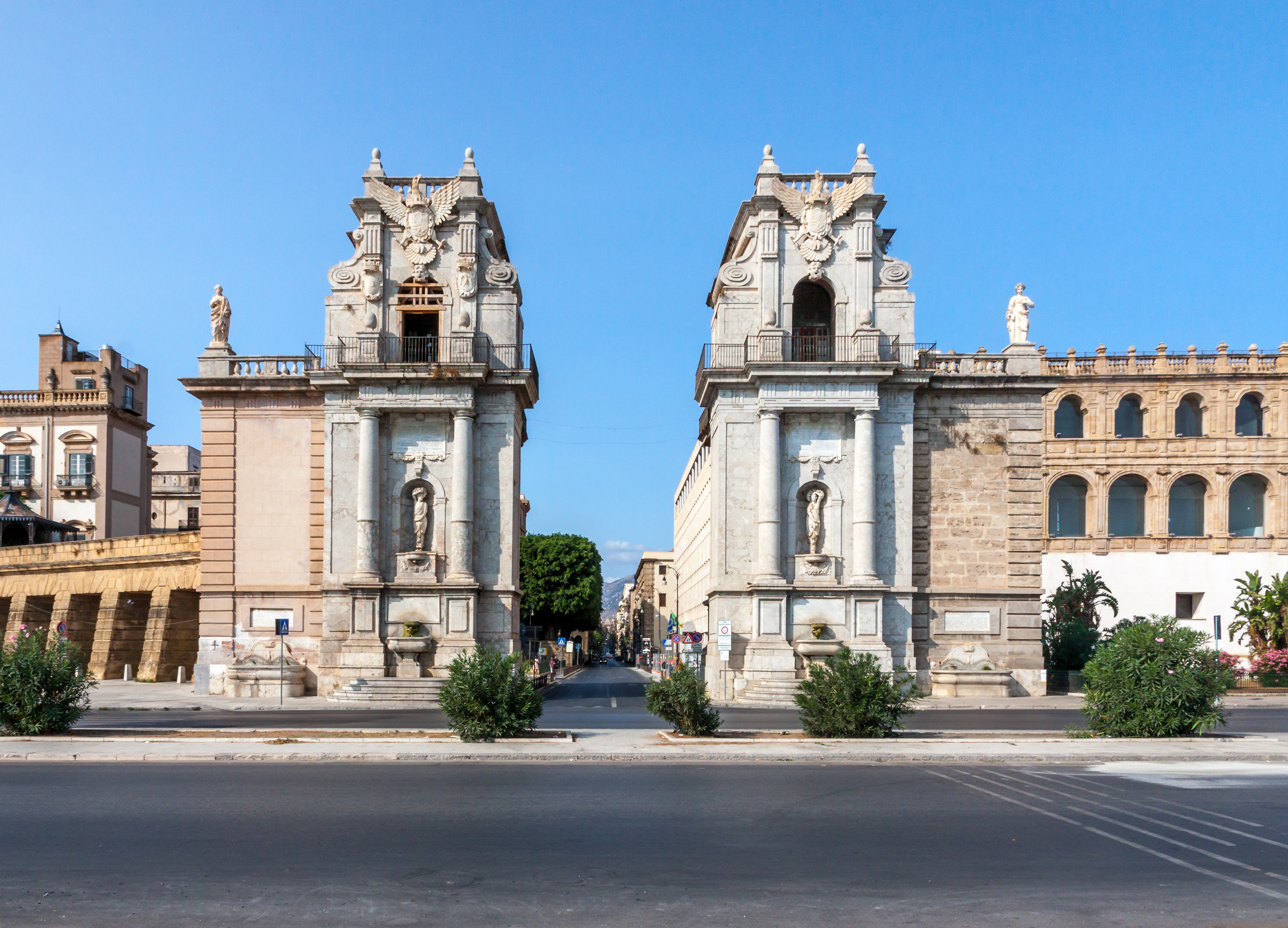
Porta Felice

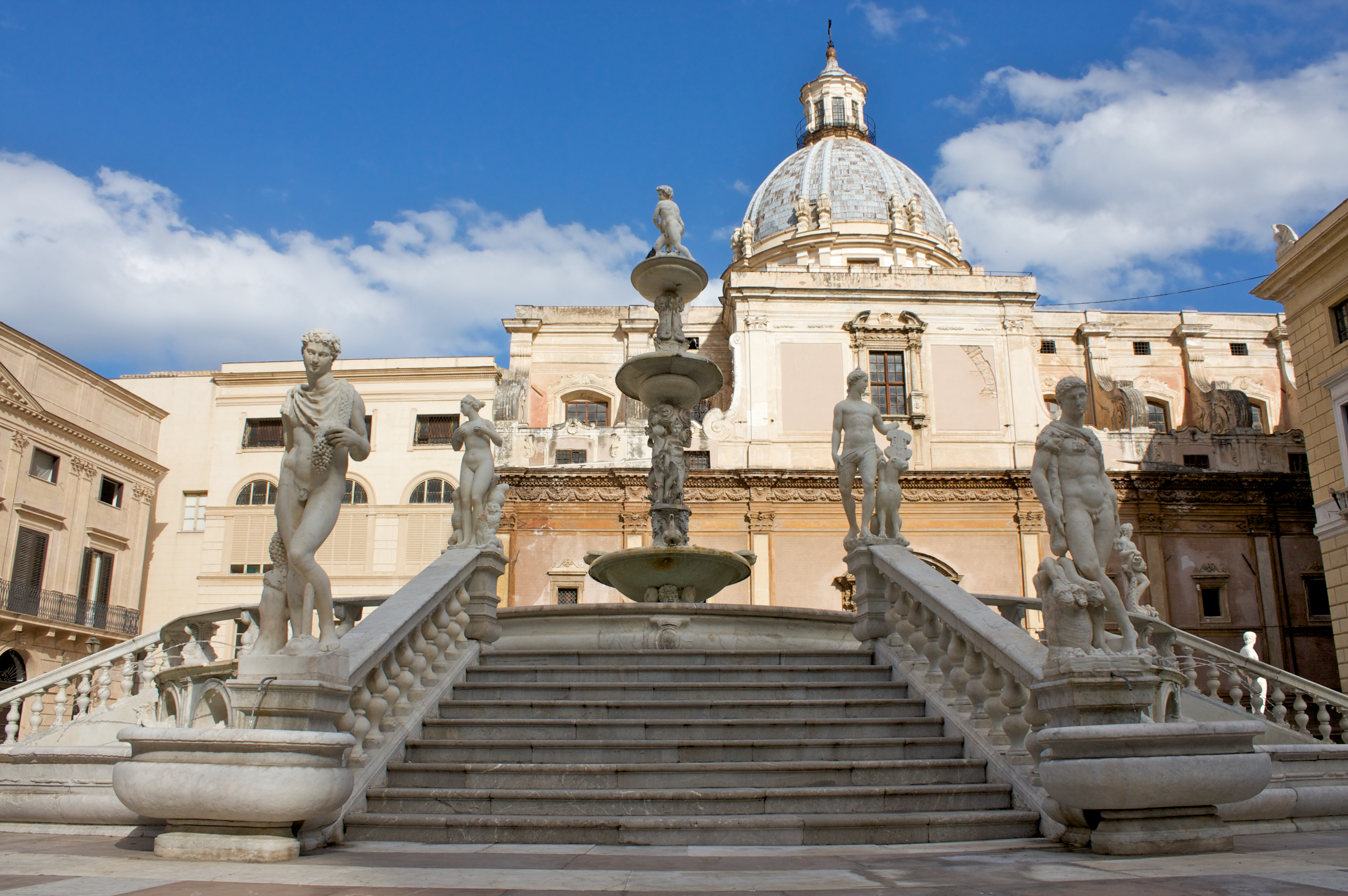
Fontana Pretoria with the dome of Santa Caterina in the background

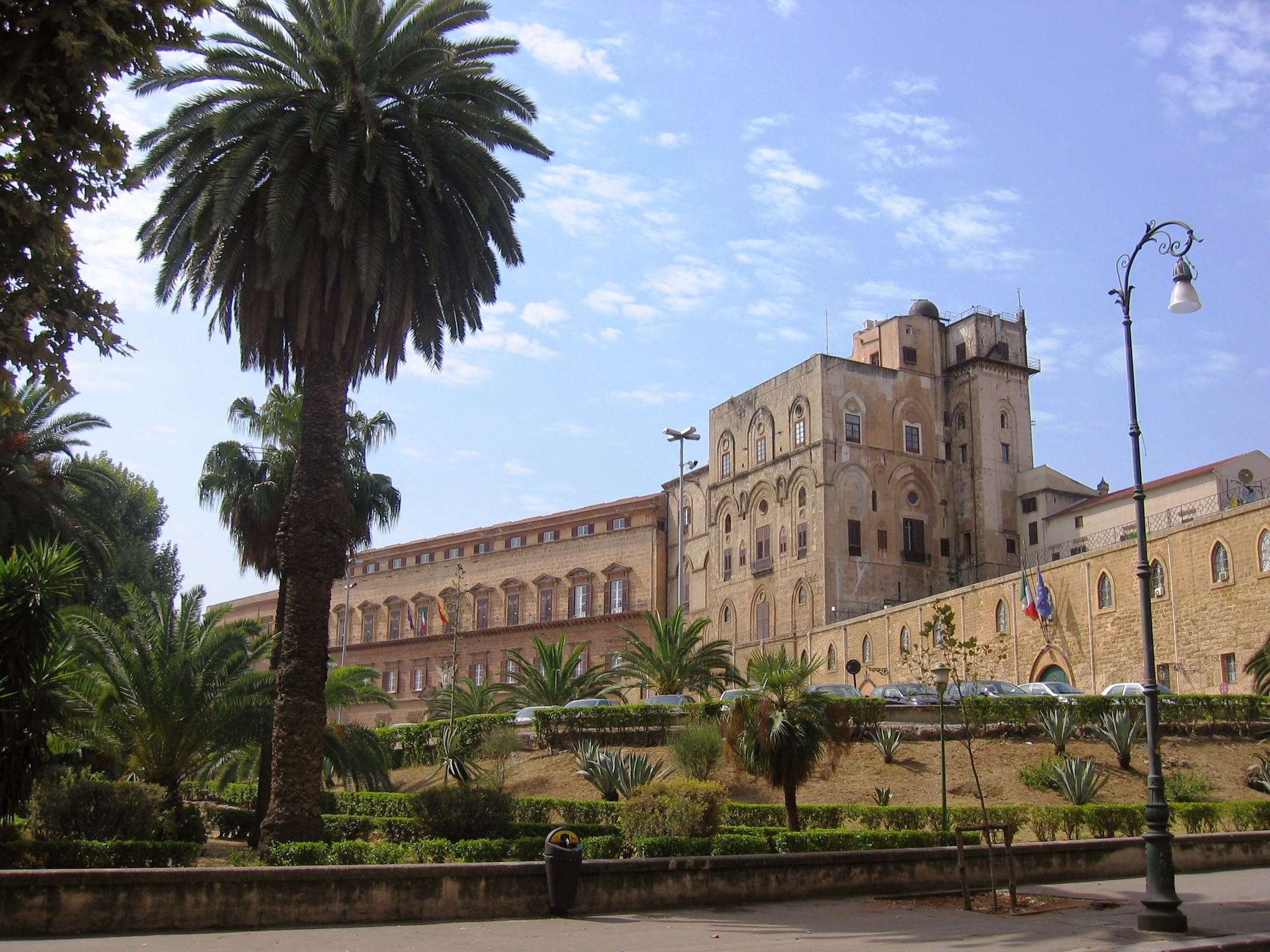
Palazzo dei Normanni

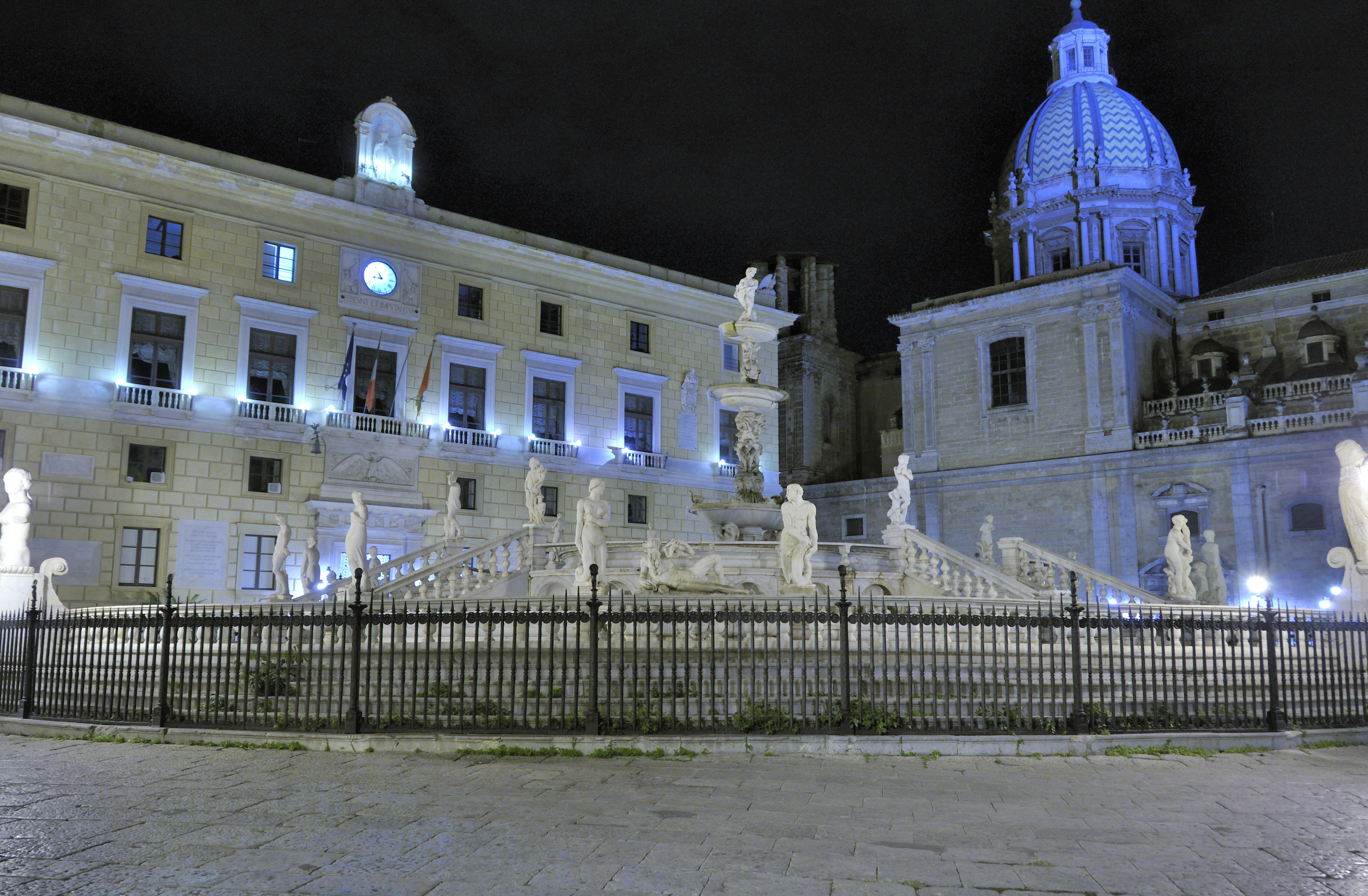
Palazzo Pretorio

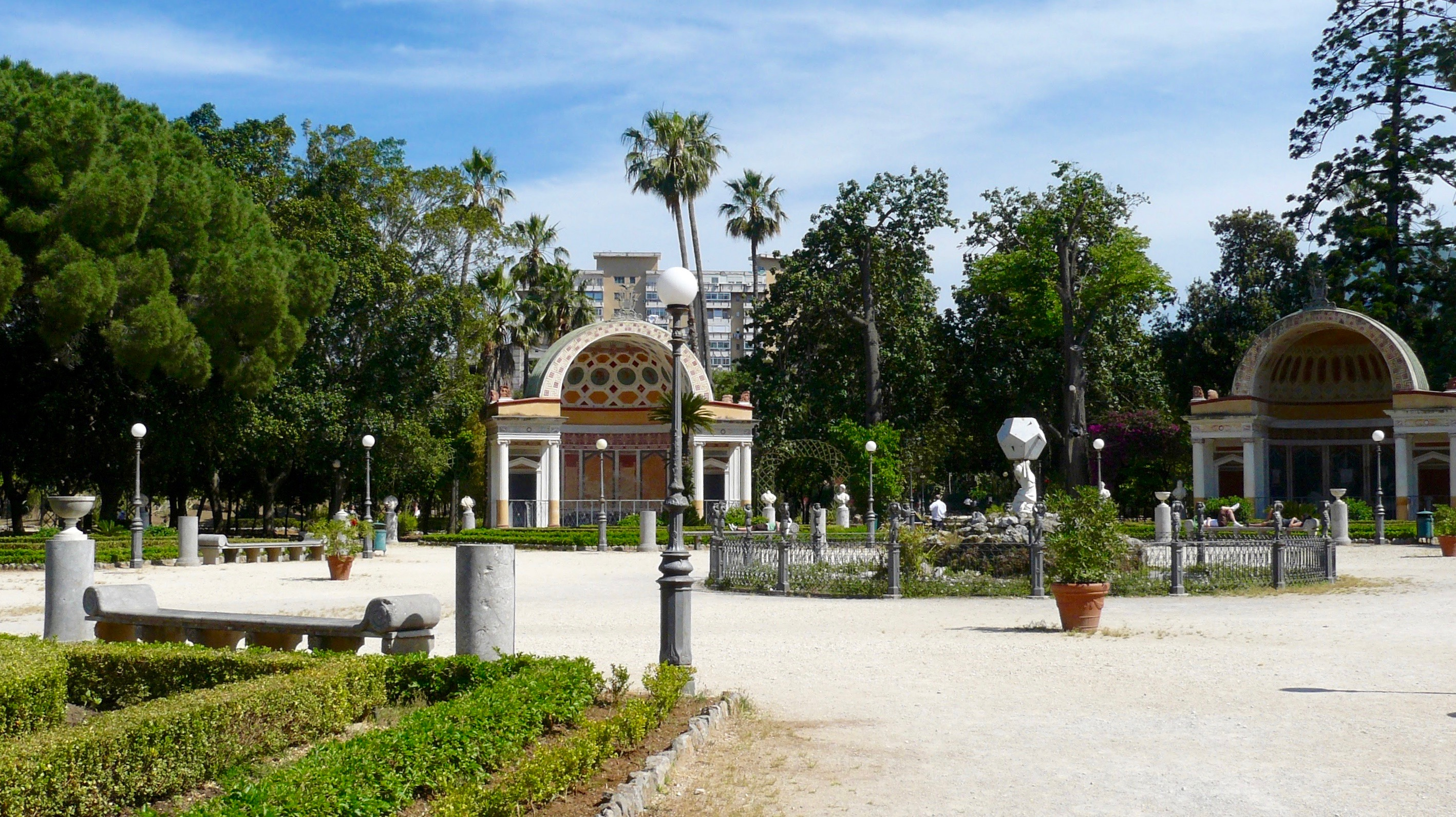
Villa Giulia

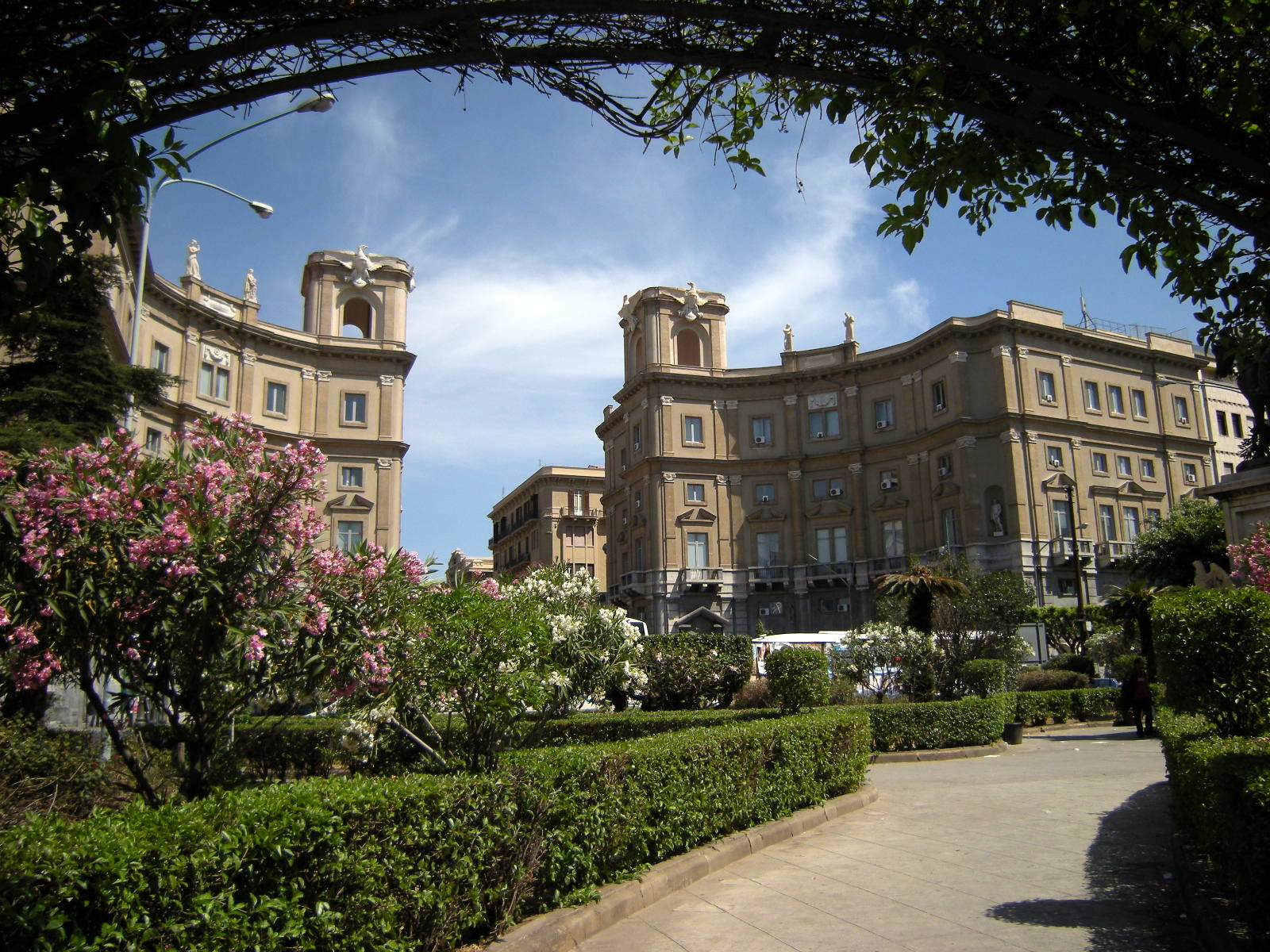
Monumental entrance of Via Roma

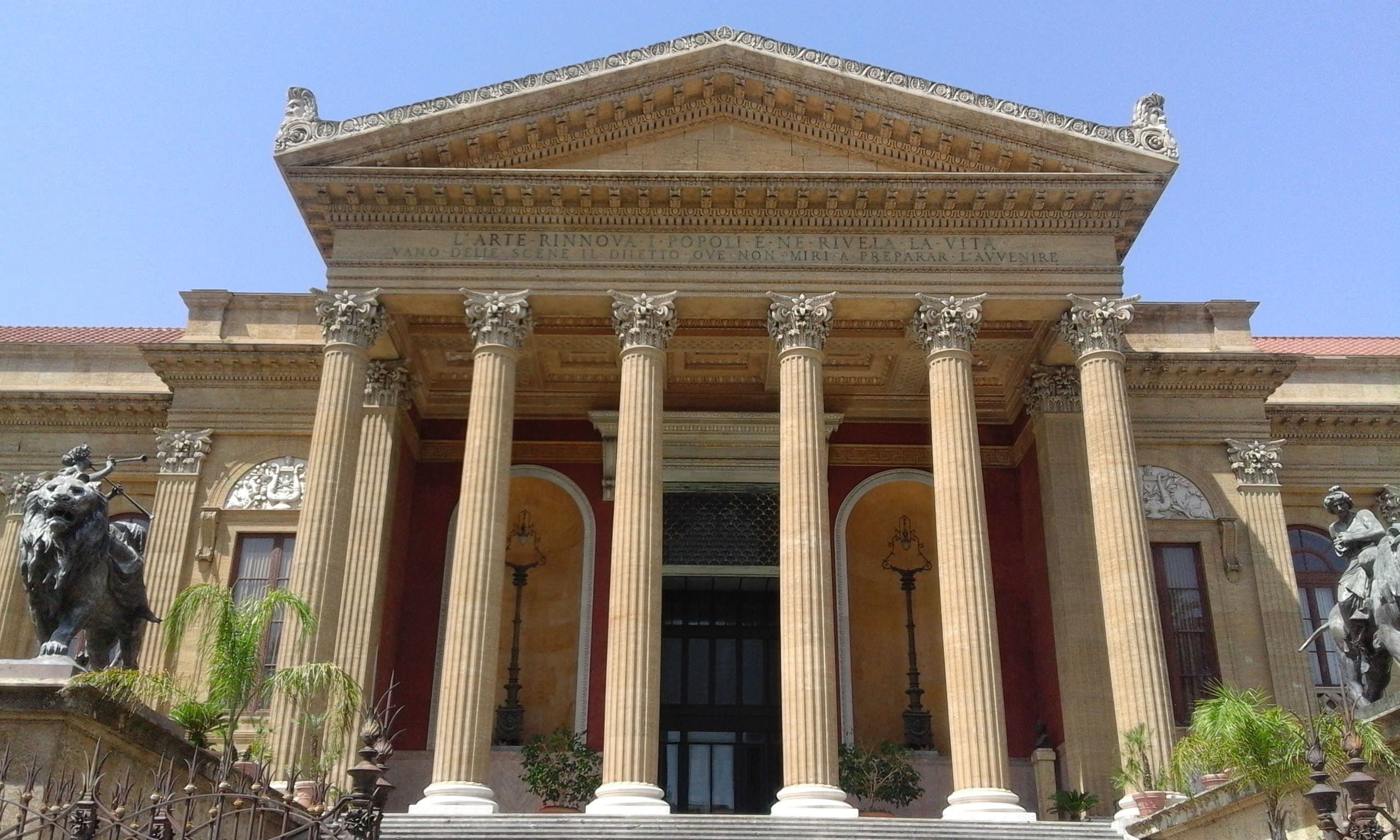
Teatro Massimo

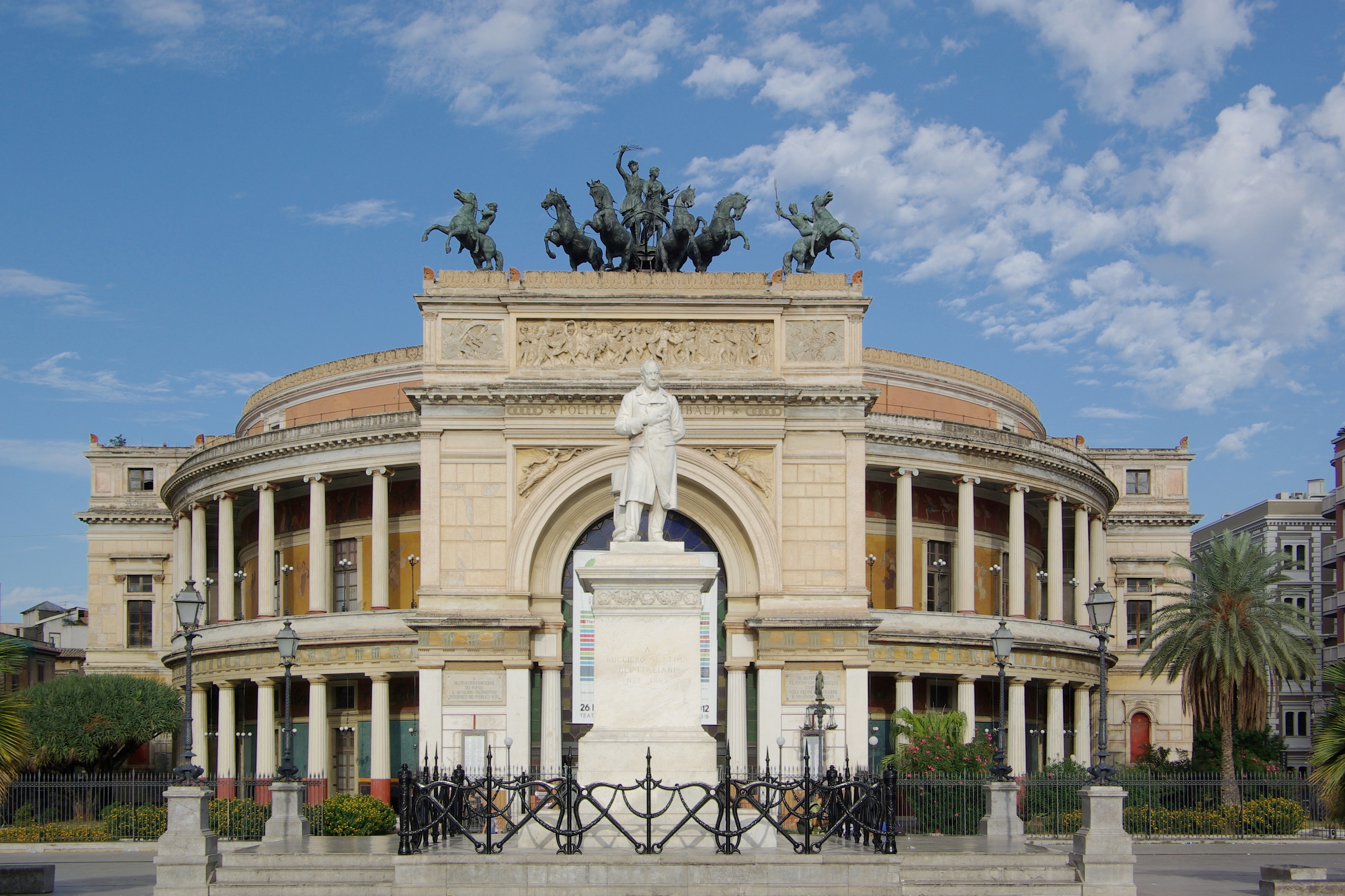
Teatro Politeama

- Tourist attractions
  - Museums in Palermo
  - Shopping areas and markets

==== Ancient monuments in Palermo ====
- Catacombe dei Cappuccini
  - Rosalia Lombardo
- City walls

==== Bridges in Palermo ====
- Ponte dell'Ammiraglio

==== Castles in Palermo ====
- Castello a Mare
- Castello di Maredolce
- Zisa

==== Churches in Palermo ====
Churches in Palermo

- Church of San Cataldo
- Church of the Gesù
- Church of the Holy Spirit
- La Magione
- Oratorio del Rosario di San Domenico
- Oratory of Saint Lawrence
- Palermo Cathedral
- San Domenico
- San Francesco d'Assisi
- San Francesco Saverio
- San Giorgio dei Genovesi
- San Giovanni degli Eremiti
- San Giuseppe dei Teatini
- Sant'Agostino
- Santa Maria della Pietà, Palermo
- Santa Maria dello Spasimo
- Santissimo Salvatore

==== City Gates of Palermo ====
- Porta Felice
- Porta Nuova

==== Fountains in Palermo ====
- Fontana del Garraffo
- Fontana del Genio a Villa Giulia
- Fontana Pretoria

==== Museums and galleries in Palermo ====
- Modern Art Gallery Sant'Anna
- Palazzo Riso
- Regional Archeological Museum Antonio Salinas
  - Palermo Fragment
  - Palermo Stone

==== Palaces and villas in Palermo ====
- Cuba Palace
- Palazzina Cinese
- Palazzo Abatellis
  - The Triumph of Death
- Palazzo Ajutamicristo
- Palazzo Chiaramonte
- Palazzo Comitini
- Palazzo Isnello
  - Apotheosis of Palermo
- Palazzo dei Normanni
  - Cappella Palatina
  - Palermo Astronomical Observatory
- Palazzo Natoli
- Palazzo Pretorio
- Palazzo Sclafani
- Palazzo Valguarnera-Gangi
- Villa Malfitano Whitaker

==== Parks and gardens in Palermo ====
- Orto botanico di Palermo
- Parco della Favorita
- Villa Giulia

==== Public squares in Palermo ====
- Piazza Bellini
- Piazza Castelnuovo
- Piazza della Vittoria
- Piazza Marina
- Piazza Pretoria
- Quattro Canti
- Piazza Ruggero Settimo
- Piazza San Domenico
- Piazza Verdi

==== Streets and walking paths in Palermo ====
- Cassaro
- Foro Italico
- Via Maqueda
- Via Roma

==== Theatres in Palermo ====
- Teatro Biondo
- Teatro Massimo
- Teatro Politeama

=== Demographics of Palermo ===
Demographics of Palermo

== Government and politics of Palermo ==
Government and politics of Palermo

- Government of Palermo
  - List of mayors of Palermo

== History of Palermo ==
History of Palermo

=== History of Palermo, by period ===
Timeline of Palermo

- Early history
- Middle Ages
- Two Sicilies
- Italian unification and today

=== History of Palermo, by subject ===
- Battle of Palermo

== Culture of Palermo ==
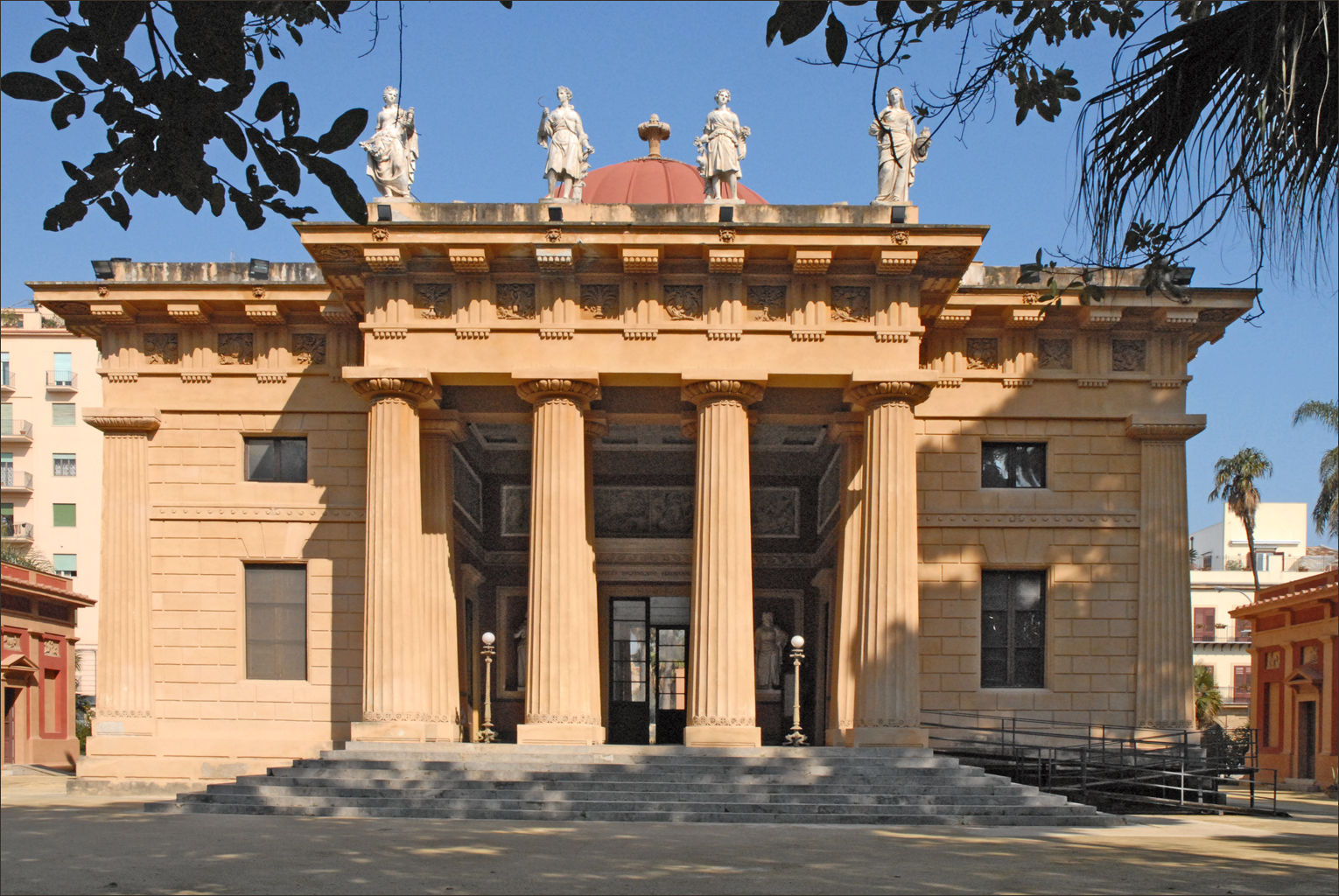
Orto botanico di Palermo, the entrance

Culture of Palermo

=== Arts in Palermo ===
==== Architecture in Palermo ====
Neoclassical architecture in Palermo

- Entrance to the Palermo Botanical Garden
- Accademia di Belle Arti di Palermo

==== Music of Palermo ====
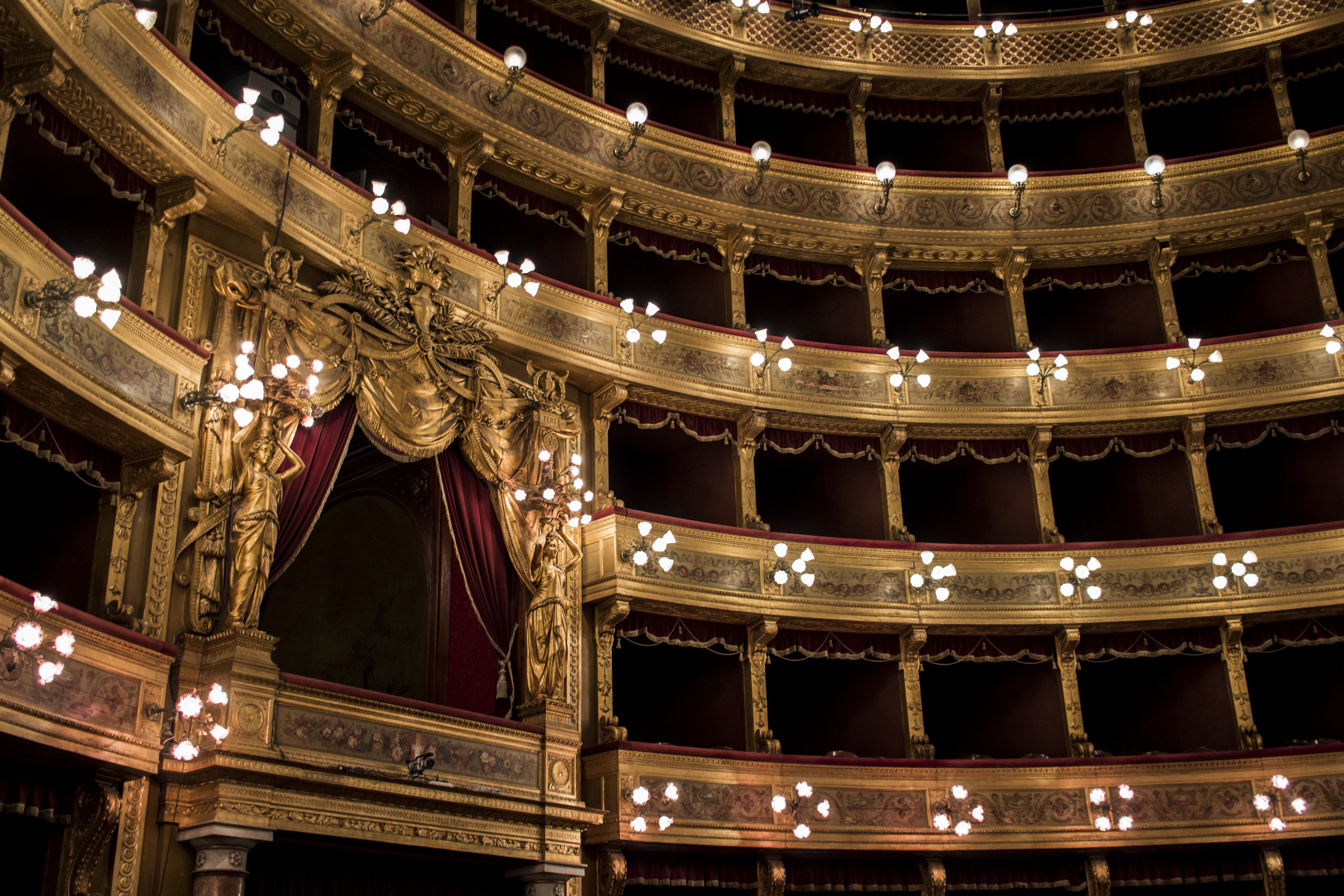
The auditorium of the Teatro Massimo, the biggest in Italy, and one of the largest of Europe

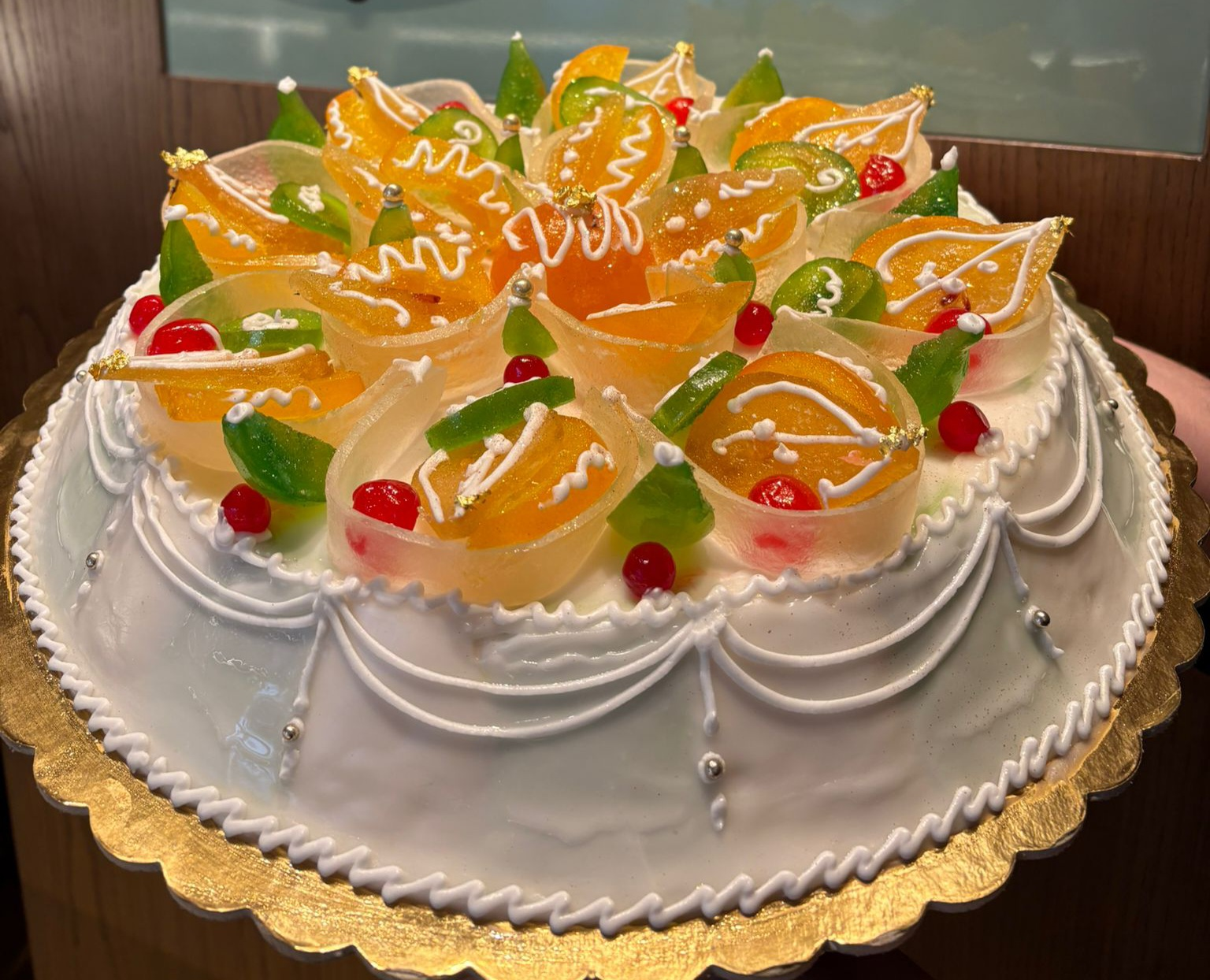
Cassata, a traditional sweet from Palermo

- Opera houses
  - Teatro Massimo

==== Visual arts of Palermo ====
- Cuisine of Palermo
  - Cassata

=== Religion in Palermo ===
- Christianity in Palermo
  - Bishop of Palermo
  - Diocese of Palermo
  - Catholicism in Palermo
    - Roman Catholic Archdiocese of Palermo

=== Sports in Palermo ===
Sports in Palermo

- Sports venues in Palermo
  - Diamante Fondo Patti
  - Stadio Renzo Barbera
  - Velodromo Paolo Borsellino

== Economy and infrastructure of Palermo ==
Economy of Palermo

Banking in Palermo

- Banca Nuova

=== Transportation in Palermo ===
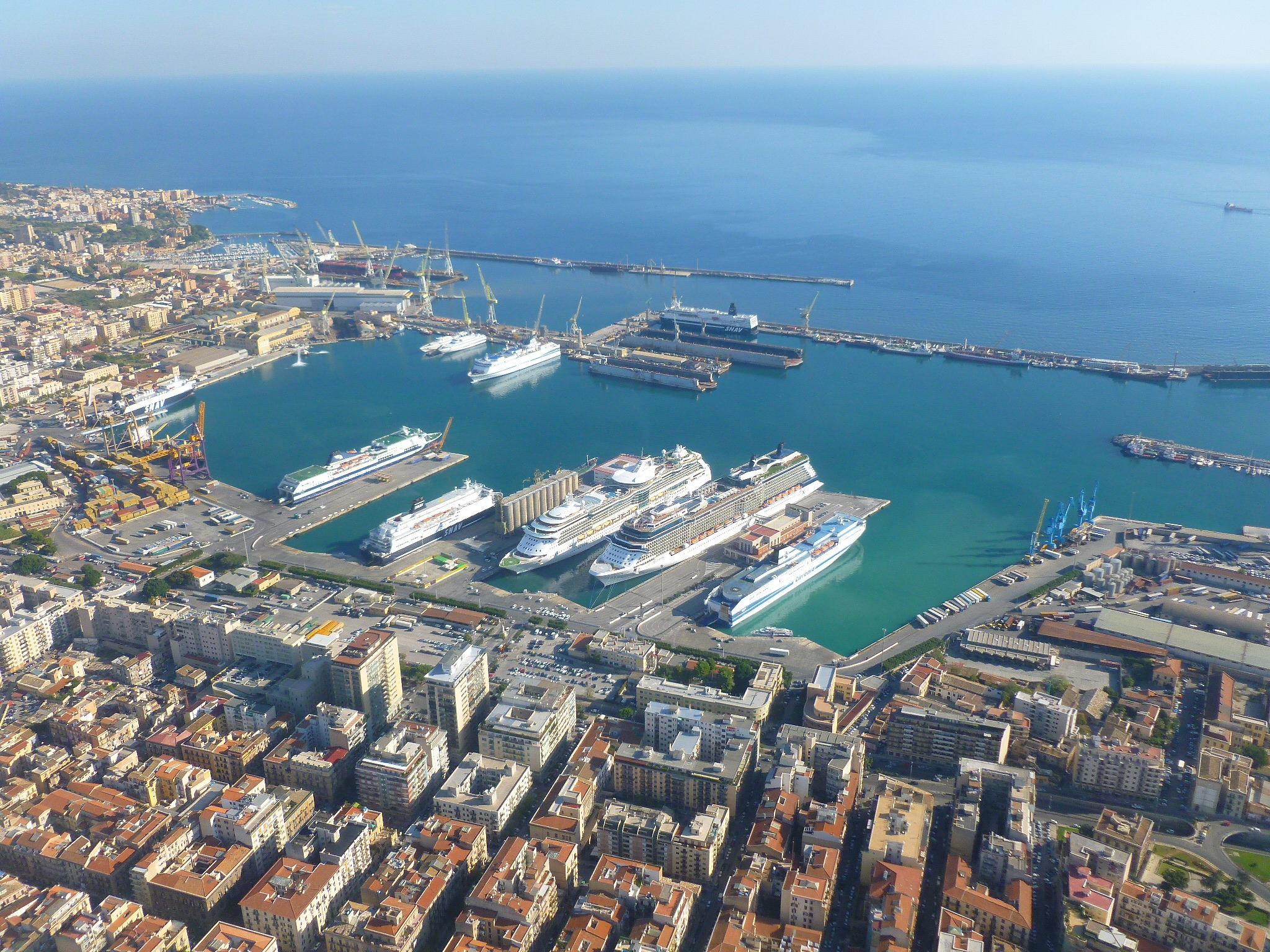
Port of Palermo

Transportation in Palermo

Airports in Palermo

- Falcone–Borsellino Airport
- Palermo–Boccadifalco Airport

Bus transport in Palermo

Ports in Palermo

- Port of Palermo

==== Rail transport in palermo ====
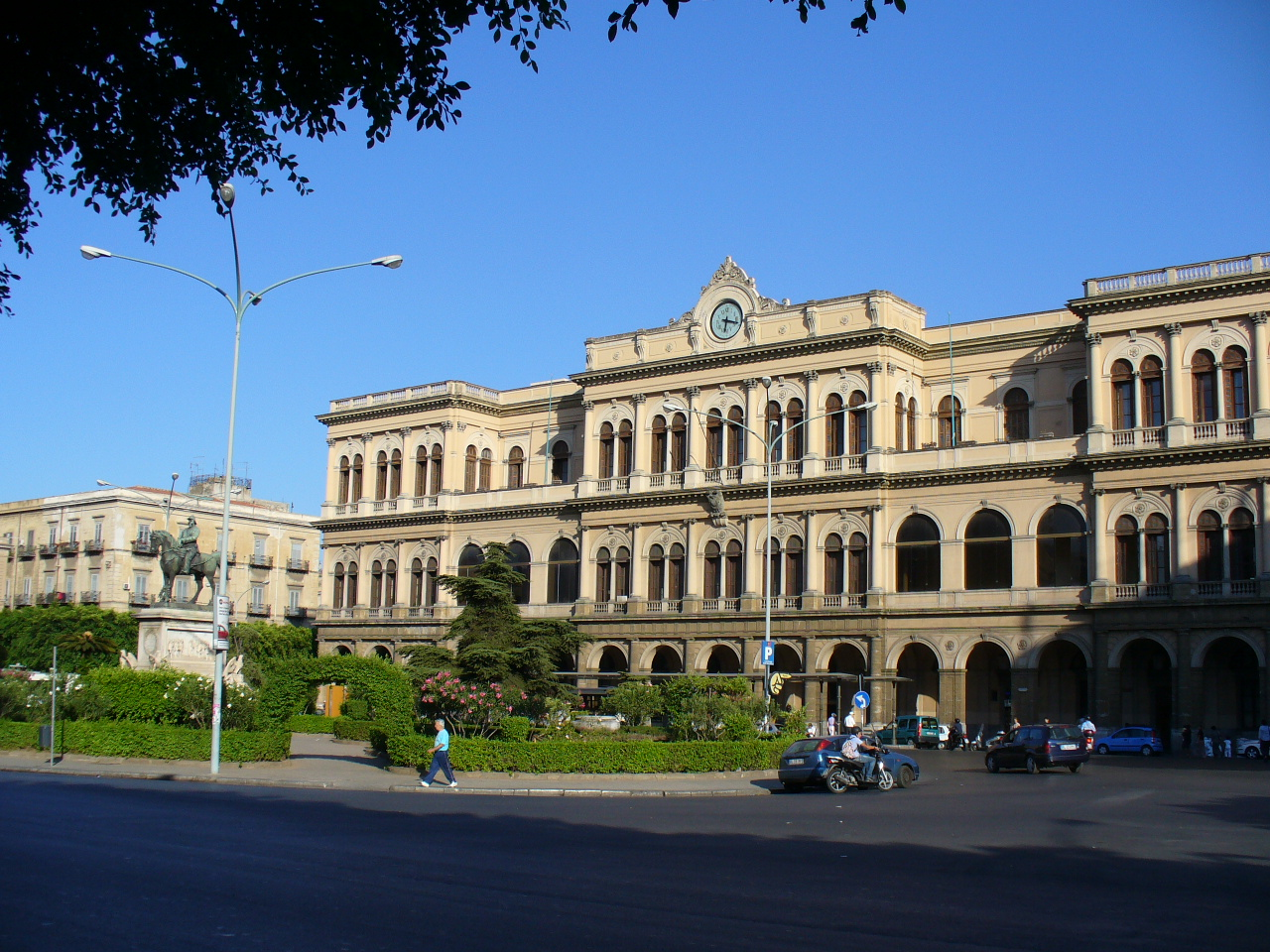
Palermo Centrale railway station

- Commuter rail
  - Palermo metropolitan railway stations
    - Palermo Centrale railway station
    - Palermo Notarbartolo railway station
    - Punta Raisi railway station

Trams in Palermo

Vehicular traffic system in Palermo

- Roads in Palermo

== Education in Palermo ==
Education in Palermo

- Public education in Palermo
  - Universities in Palermo
    - University of Palermo

== See also ==
- Outline of geography
