= List of Palermo metropolitan railway stations =

This is a list of railway stations served by the Palermo metropolitan railway service.

- Capaci
- Cardillo-Zen
- Carini
- Federico
- Fiera
- Francia
- Giachery
- Isola delle Femmine
- Palazzo Reale-Orleans
- Palermo Aeroporto
- Palermo Centrale
- Palermo Notarbartolo
- Piraineto
- San Lorenzo Colli
- Tommaso Natale
- Vespri
