= Palermo Ring Railway =

Railway line in Italy

Palermo Rail Ring

Overview
- Other name: Anello ferroviario di Palermo
- Status: Under construction
- Locale: Palermo, Sicily, Italy
- Stations: 8

Service
- Type: Commuter rail
- System: Palermo metropolitan railway service
- Operator: Trenitalia

History
- Opened: 4 November 2026

Technical
- Track gauge: 1,435 mm (4 ft 8 1/2 in) standard gauge

The Palermo Rail Ring is a railway line in Sicily, Italy. It opened on the 4th of November 2026 and extends from Palermo Notarbartolo railway station to Giachery station.

== History ==
The two main aims of the project are to improve commuter traffic in and around Palermo and also to reduce urban congestion in the city. Another objective is to improve the sustainable mobility of the area. During the construction period, about 750 new jobs were expected to be created.

== Route ==
The route is an underground circular single track railway with a length of about 6.5 km, which was initially projected for completion in 2018. It was later projected for 2021-2022 and finally opened on 2026.

== Stations ==
New underground stations on the line are as follows:

- Libertà
- Porto
- Politeama
- Malaspina

== Future ==
The long term plan for the railway is for the ring to be extended south to Termini Imerese, and a railway bypass will be built at Palermo Centrale. Rail transport services on this section that connects Palermo Centrale to the Airport, will take place every 15 minutes compared to the present frequency of 30 minutes.

== See also ==
- Palermo metropolitan railway service
