= Castello di Maredolce =

Coordinates: 38°05′32.39″N 13°23′14.93″E

Maredolce Castle
- Castello di Maredolce
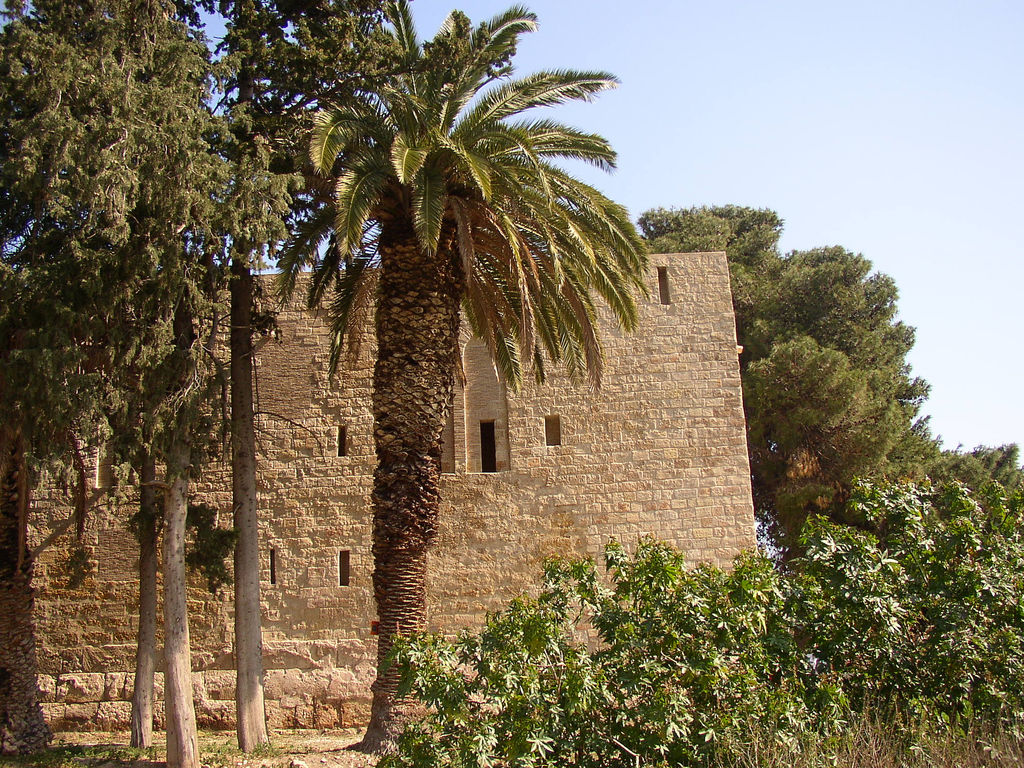
- Walls of the castle
- Interactive map of the Maredolce Castle area
- Alternative names: Palazzo della Favara

General information
- Type: Palace
- Architectural style: Arab-Norman
- Location: Palermo 90121, Sicily, Italy, Vicolo del Castellaccio 23
- Completed: 12th century

The Maredolce Castle (Italian: Castello di Maredolce), also called Favara Palace (Italian: Palazzo della Favara), is a medieval building of Palermo. During the Siculo-Norman age it represented one of the "Solatii Regii", pleasure palaces, of the Kings of Sicily. It is located within Favara Park, in the neighbourhood of Brancaccio.

== History ==
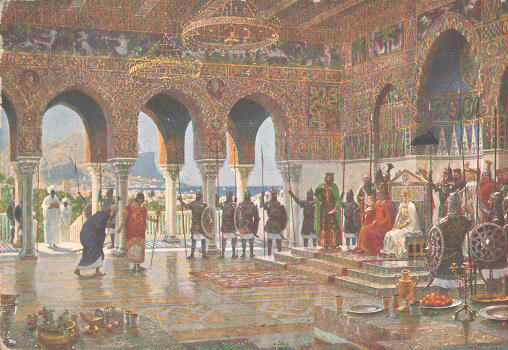
Michael Zeno Diemer, Frederick II and his court at the Maredolce Castle

The origins of the building remains shrouded in mystery. Some scholars tend to attribute the foundation of the castle to the emir Ja'far al-Kalbi (998-1019), believing that it was built over a preexisting structure. Other scholars believe that the castle dates back to the Norman era, although others consider that just the lake of the Favara Park was realized in the age of the Hauteville dynasty. The first documents regarding the castle and its park are the "Chronicon sive Annales" of Romuald Guarna and a poem of the muslim poet Abd ar-Rahman al-Itrabanishi (12th century).

In 1071, during the military campaign to conquer Palermo, the area of the castle was occupied by the Norman Count Roger I. After a few decades, it was used as one of the "Solatii Regii" erected along the royal parks of the city and, thus, became one of the royal residence of the first King of Sicily, Roger II. The structure was a part of a fortified complex located at the foot of Monte Grifone, probably closed within a surrounding wall including the palace, a ḥammām and an artificial lake.

In 1328 the King Frederick III gave the castle and the park to the Teutonic Order, whose headquarters was at the Basilica della Magione. During this period the structure was used as a hospital. In the 15th century the castle passed to the noble family Beccadelli di Bologna. In 17th century another change of ownership occurred and the castle was ceded to the Duke Francesco Agraz. Under the ownership of the Agraz family the building was left in a state of massive neglect and, thus, became known with the epithet of "Castellaccio".

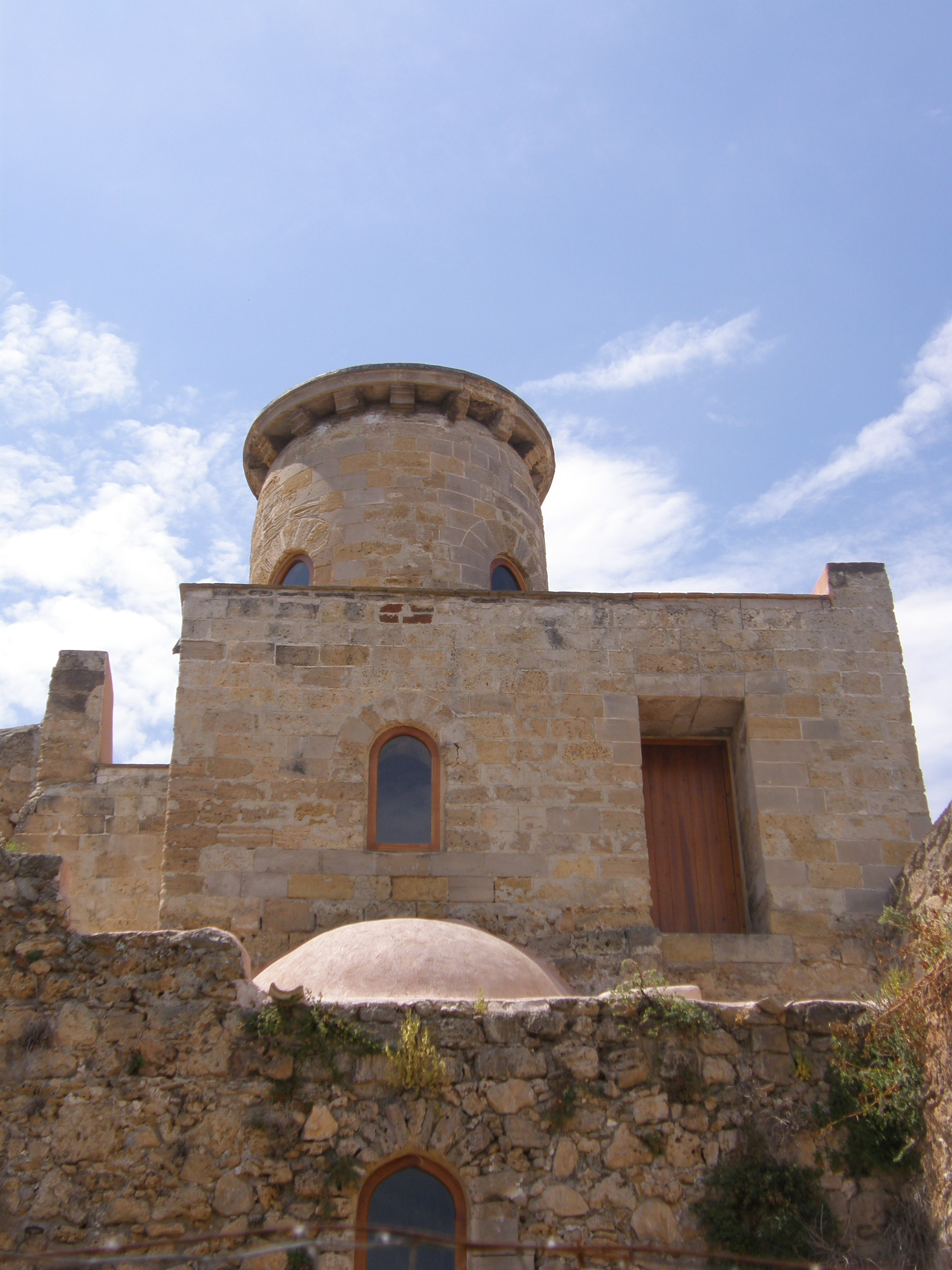
The dome of the chapel

In 1992 the Sicilian Region has acquired the complex thanks to an expropriation. The restoration started in 2007, but even in 2016 some spaces near the castle are unlawfully occupied. The still precarious conditions of the structure have temporarily prevented the inclusion of the castle within the Unesco World Heritage Site called Arab-Norman Palermo and the Cathedral Churches of Cefalù and Monreale.

== Description ==
By the will of Roger II, the building was surrounded by an artificial lake, at the centre of the Favara Park. The lake had at its heart an artificial island (2 hectares) and was obtained thanks to a dam interrupting the path of the source of Monte Grifone. In 16th century this source ran dry.

The building has a quadrangular drawing and is equipped with a large courtyard. Inside the castle is also present a "palatin chapel", dedicated to the saints Philip and James.

Public transit Palermo tramway: line 1 stop Amedeo D'Aosta + AMAT bus: line 210.

== Gallery ==
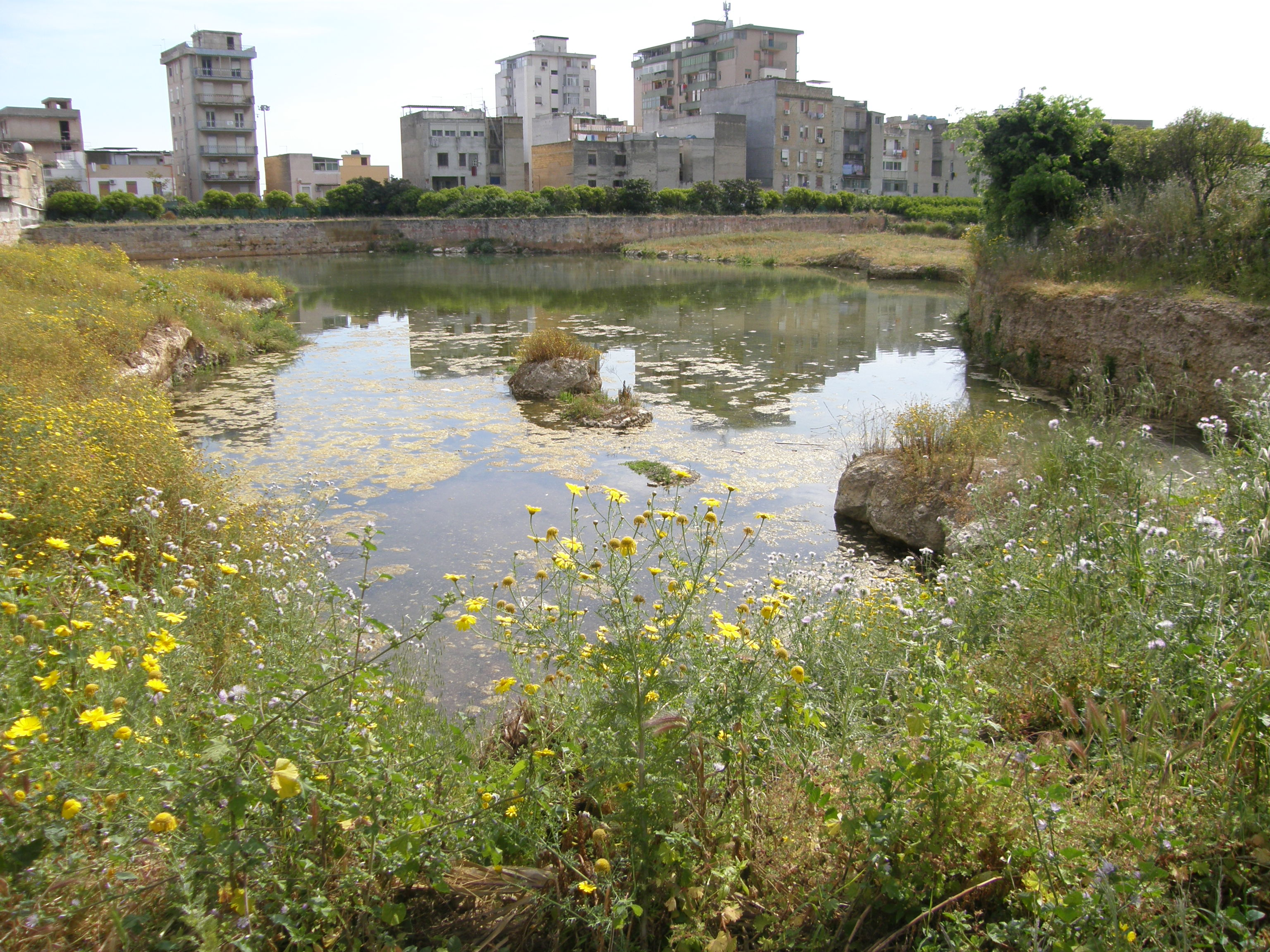
View of the park with the lake

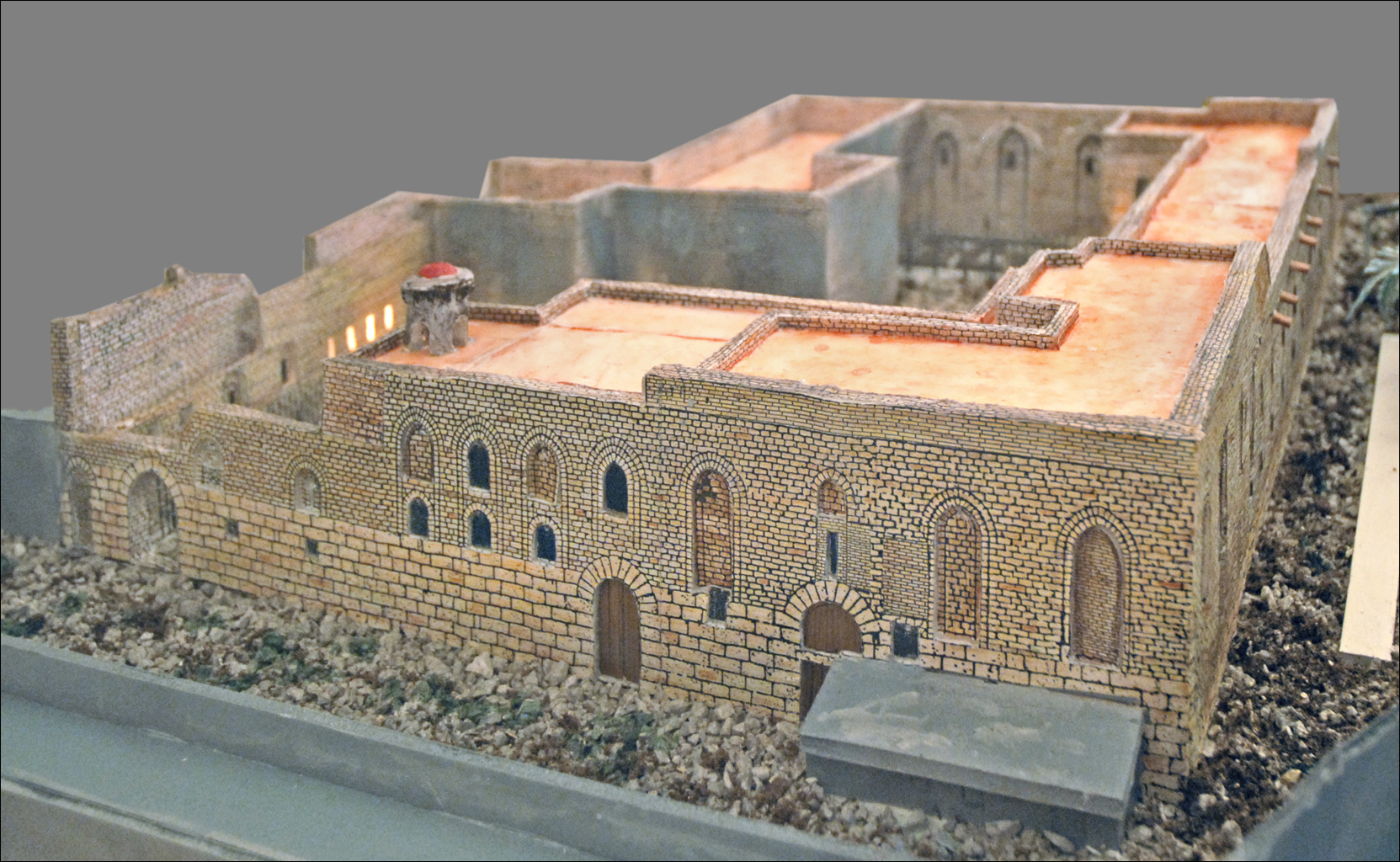
Model of the "Favara" palace in Maredolce

== See also ==
- Parco della Favara
- Solatii Regii
- Zisa, Palermo
- Cuba, Palermo
