= Palasport Fondo Patti =

Sports arena in Palermo, Italy

- Interactive map of Palasport Fondo Patti
- Location: Palermo, Italy
- Coordinates: 38.191389°N 13.3175°E
- Owner: Municipality of Palermo
- Capacity: 5,500 (sports); 6,000 (concerts)
- Surface: wooden parquet

Construction
- Built: 1997-1999
- Opened: 3 October 1999
- Renovated: set for 2016
- Closed: 25 March 2008
- Architect: Manfredi Nicoletti

Tenants
- Ares Palermo (basketball), 2006-2008; Iveco Palermo (handball), 1999-2001

The Palasport Fondo Patti was Palermo's main sports arena from 1999 until 2008, when it was closed because of severe damages suffered after a heavy storm.

Its name derives from the neighbourhood in Palermo where it was built, located in the Palermitan suburb Partanna Mondello on via dell'Olimpo.

== History ==
The venue was realised by the Italian architect Manfredi Nicoletti, and was inaugurated on 3 October 1999. It had a seating capacity of 5,500 to 6,000 depending on its use, and an adjacent car parking for 500 cars. In March 2008, following a heavy storm that hit the city, the arena's roof was severely damaged, causing a damage in excess of €200,000. Due to lack of funding by the Municipality of Palermo the venue was left abandoned. Over the years, the complete neglect as well as vandalism, such as an arson in 2010, have made the area completely inaccessible. Costs to repair the structure have risen from the original €200,000 to over €1 million.

In April 2014 the City of Palermo has announced its commitment to renovate and reopen the Palasport Fondo Patti. Renovations were due to last for one year at an estimated cost of €1.2 million, which would also include renovation of the nearby baseball stadium Diamante Fondo Patti, another sports venue left to decay since its opening in 1998. The official reopening of the venues has been pushed back to 2016, however, as of summer 2015 no work on any of the sports venues has begun.

In December 2014 local media reported that the City of Palermo was being sued by a local family for the illegitimate expropriation of their land in the late 1990s - the site where the Palasport Fondo Patti was built on. In an out of court settlement, the City of Palermo agreed to pay €13 million in damages to the family.

== Music at Palasport Fondo Patti ==
During its heyday the Palasport hosted also many non-sportive events. Below is an incomplete list of some of the artists who have performed at the Palasport.

- 1998: Liza Minnelli (opening gala at the nearby baseball stadium, Diamante Fondo Patti)
- 2000: Claudio Baglioni
- 2002: Giorgia; Zucchero
- 2003: Luciano Ligabue; Notre-Dame de Paris (Musical)
- 2005: Elisa; Jovanotti
- 2006: Antonello Venditti; Claudio Baglioni
- 2007: Deep Purple; Elisa; Max Pezzali
- 2008: Gianna Nannini; Subsonica; Giorgia; Antonello Venditti
