= Trams in Palermo =

Tram system in Palermo, Italy

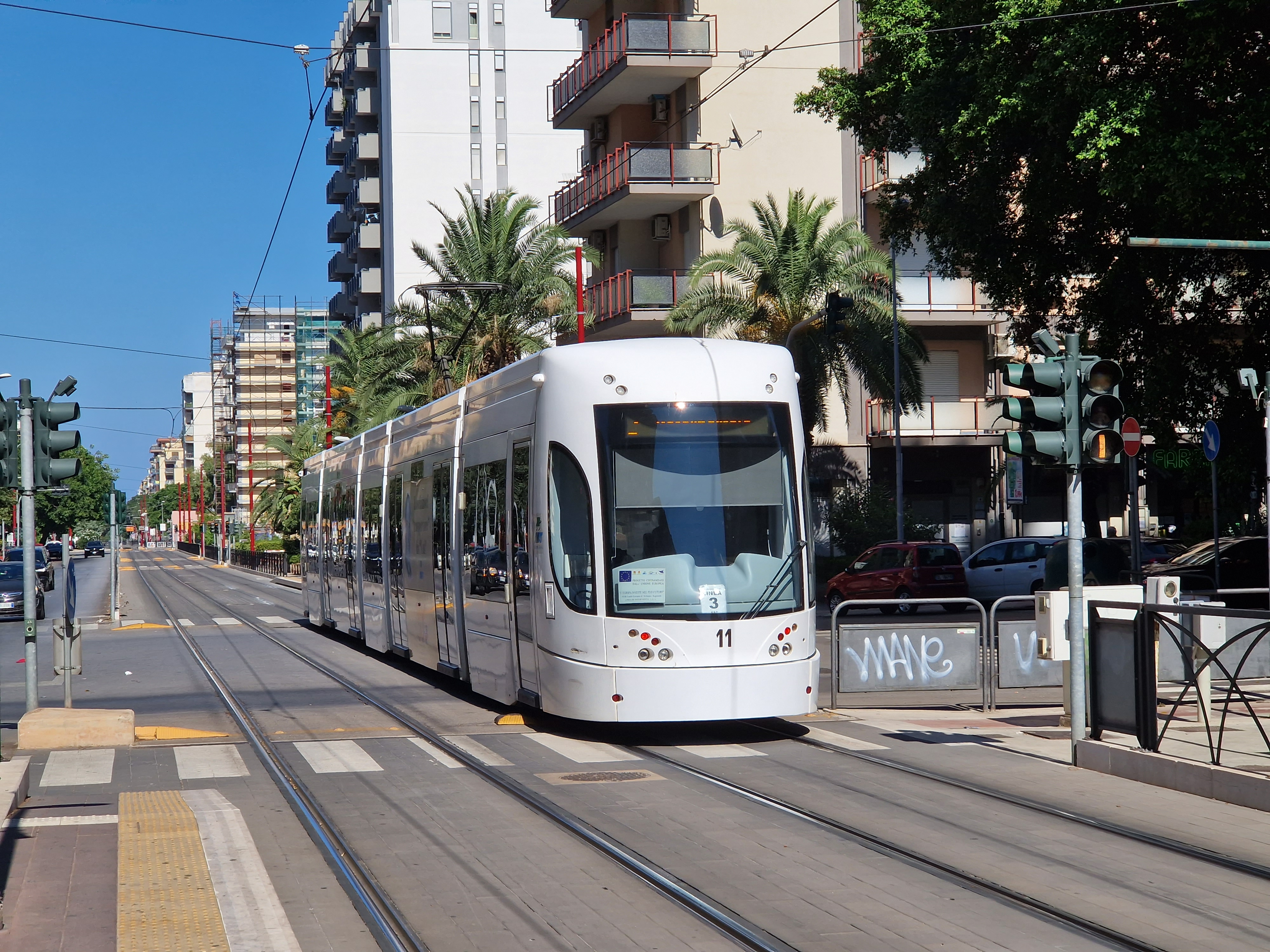

Overview
- Locale: Palermo, Italy
- Transit type: Tram
- Number of lines: 4
- Number of stations: 44

Operation
- Began operation: 30 December 2015
- Operator: AMAT
- Train length: 32 m

Technical
- System length: 15 km (9.3 mi)
- Track gauge: 1,435 mm (4 ft 8 1/2 in)
- Electrification: 750 V DC
- Top speed: 70 km/h (43 mph)
System map

Line 1 Roccella – Stazione Centrale

Overview
- Native name: Linea 1
- Termini: Stazione Centrale; Roccella
- Stations: 15
- Color on map: magenta

History
- Current route since: December 30, 2015

Technical
- Line length: 5.5 km (3.4 mi)

Line 2 and Line 3 Piazza Santa Cristina/CEP – Stazione Notarbartolo

Overview
- Native name: Linea 2 e Linea 3
- Termini: 2 Piazza Santa Cristina 3 CEP; Stazione Notarbartolo
- Stations: 2 13 and 3 12
- Color on map: 2 orange and 3 green

History
- Current route since: December 30, 2015

Technical
- Line length: 2 4.8 km (3.0 mi) and 3 5.0 km (3.1 mi)

Line 4 Pollaci/Calatafimi – Stazione Notarbartolo

Overview
- Native name: Linea 4
- Termini: Pollaci/Calatafimi; Stazione Notarbartolo
- Stations: 18
- Color on map: blue

History
- Current route since: December 30, 2015

Technical
- Line length: 8.0 km (5.0 mi)

The Palermo tramway network (Italian: Rete tranviaria di Palermo) is part of the public transport network of Palermo, Italy. It consists of four operational light rail lines; three more lines were under planning as of 2015. Service launched on 30 December 2015. The current network operator is AMAT.

== History ==
=== Former tram system ===
In 1878, the Società Sicula Tramways Omnibus (SSTO) started to operate omnibuses and horsecars in Palermo. In May 1899, the SSTO opened its first electric tram line. By 1901, the SSTO had 9 tram lines in operation, In 1904, the SSTO changed its name to Società Sicula Imprese Elettriche (SSIE), and open a tenth tram line. By 1908, the SSIE had 10 tram lines in operation:

- Piazza Bologni – Rocca: opened May 1899, extended to Monreale in 1900
- Piazza Marina – Romagnolo: opened later in 1899
- Piazza Indipendenza – Porta Reale: opened in 1899
- Piazza Marina – Acquasanta: opened in May 1900
- Piazza Marina – Noce: opened in June 1900
- Piazza Indipendenza – Ucciardone: opened July 1900
- Ucciardone – Falde: opened July 1900
- Ucciardone – San Lorenzo: opened September 1900, extended to Tommaso Natale and Sferracavallo in 1914
- Piazza Rivoluzione – Torrelunga: opened February 1901
- Piazza indipendenza – Porrazzi: opened in 1908

In 1906, a second tramway company, Società Italo Belga "Les Tramways de Palerme" (SIB), was formed. It opened four new tram lines in 1912:

- Stazione Centrale – Leoni: opened June 1912
- Stazione Centrale – Politeama – Zisa: opened June 1912
- Stazione Centrale – Politeama – Ucciardone – Acquasanta: opened June 1912
- Montepellegrino – Mondello: opened November 1912, extended to Partanna in July 1916

During crises following World War I, the two tramway companies had difficulties. The Unione Trazione Elettrica e Trasporti della Sicilia (UTETS) took over the SSIE in 1925 and the SIB in December 1929. In February 1930, the Società Anonima Industria Autobus (SAIA) started operating 14 bus lines some in direct competition with the tram system of the UTETS. In June 1933, the UTETS changed its name to Tramvie di Palermo (TdP). In August 1939, TdP management decided to replace trams with trolley buses. in December 1940, the "Società Anonima Siciliana Trasporti" (SAST) took over the conversion from TdP. This conversion was slow during World War II due to wartime scarcities. The conversion was completed in August 1946 with the replacement of lines 14 via Mondello, 15 via Partanna e 16 via Valdesi, thus ending tram service in Palermo.

=== Modern tramway ===
In 2000, the European Investment Bank provided approximately €88 million for the construction of three tram lines along Via Leonardo da Vinci, Corso Calatafimi, and Corso dei Mille. In August 2001, the project was temporarily blocked by a commissioner of the city of Palermo, Guglielmo Serio, because parking spaces along the route needed to be defined and he disagreed with the routing on the Corso Calatafimi due to limited space.

The project was finally approved by the city in May 2002. In 2005, after two unsuccessful tenders, the construction work was awarded to a temporary consortium for €192 million. The first test runs on line 1 were carried out in July 2014. All four tram lines were opened on December 30, 2015.

== Network ==
The tram network consists of four lines:

- 1 Roccella – Stazione Centrale
- 2 Borgo Nuovo – Stazione Notarbartolo
- 3 CEP – Stazione Notarbartolo
- 4 Corso Calatafimi – Stazione Notarbartolo

The system is split into two unconnected parts, each requiring a separate tram depot. Lines 2, 3 and 4 converge and terminate at Stazione Notarbartolo. The isolated line 1 terminates at Stazione Centrale. With few exceptions, trams operate in a right-of-way separate from road traffic. A major bus corridor connects the train stations Centrale and Notarbartolo, and there are plans to extend the tram network between the two train stations.

== Fleet ==
Palermo uses 17 Bombardier Flexity Outlook bidirectional, low-floor trams. They are 32.37 metres (106.2 ft) long and 2.4 metres (7 ft 10 in) wide and accommodate 56 seated passengers and 132 standing. Their maximum speed is 70 kilometres per hour (43 mph) and they can navigate 20-metre (66 ft) radius curves. The first tram arrived on 18 May 2011.

== Expansion ==
In September 2025, the city of Palermo approved the following extensions of the tram network:

- section D: Stazione centrale–Bonagia
- section E1: Croce Rossa–Francia
- section E2: Francia–Zen–Mondello
- section F: via Crispi–Foro Italico
- section G: Zen–Sferracavallo

The project also included five new park-and-ride facilities.

In December 2025, a consortium including D’Agostino Angelo Antonio Costruzioni (lead member), E.LU.S. and Neocos were awarded a contract to design and build three of the extensions, plus two park-and-ride facilities. The contract includes sections E1, E2 south (Francia–Zen) and F. This part of the project would cost over €149 million.

The total cost of the tram expansion project was estimated at €520 million, which includes the purchase of 35 trams. European funds would finance an additional four trams.

== See also ==
Share of "Les Tramways de Palerme S.A.", issued 14 December 1923

- List of town tramway systems in Italy
- History of rail transport in Italy
- Rail transport in Italy
- List of tram and light rail transit systems
