= Diamante Fondo Patti =

Baseball stadium in Palermo, Italy

- Interactive map of Diamante Fondo Patti
- Full name: Stadio di Baseball "Diamante Fondo Patti"
- Location: Palermo, Italy
- Coordinates: 38.11287°N 13.19021°E
- Owner: Municipality of Palermo
- Capacity: 2,000
- Surface: grass
- Field size: Foul line: 100m power alley: 100m Center: 120m

Construction
- Built: 1995-1997
- Opened: 1997
- Renovated: set for 2016

Tenants
- Warriors Paternò (baseball); Cardinals Palermo (american football)

The Diamante Fondo Patti is Palermo, Italy's main baseball stadium. Inaugurated in 1997, it has degraded since due to lack of care, even though the city had announced works to restore it in 2014.

== History ==
The stadium was inaugurated in 1997 for the 1997 Summer Universiade held in Sicily. It was also one of the venues of the Baseball World Cup held in Italy in 1998.

The stadium is located in the northern Palermitan suburb Partanna-Mondello, adjacent to Palermo's main indoor arena, the Palasport Fondo Patti.

== Current situation ==
Years of non-caring have led to the slow decay of the venue. In April 2014 the City of Palermo, owner of the stadium, announced works to restore both the baseball stadium and the nearby indoor arena.

Due to the city of Palermo's bleak financial situation, non-caring, and vandalism, the Diamante Fondo Patti is currently in a desolate state, as are many of Palermo's sports venues, such as the Velodromo Paolo Borsellino and the Palasport Fondo Patti. This situation led to Palermo losing out its European Capital of Sport 2016 bid to Prague and Košice.

== Use ==
Despite its bad condition, the stadium continues to host baseball games, as it is the only purpose-build venue for these kind of sports in Sicily. In the past it was used by third league clubs such as Palermo Baseball and UISP Zisa Palermo. In 2010 the baseball club Catania Warriors (now called Catania Warriors Paternò) reached an agreement with the city of Palermo to use the Diamante Fondo Patti for their IBL games. In 2012 it also hosted matches by Nine-man football club Cardinals Palermo.
