= Palermo Aeroporto railway station =

Railway station in Italy

Palermo Aeroporto
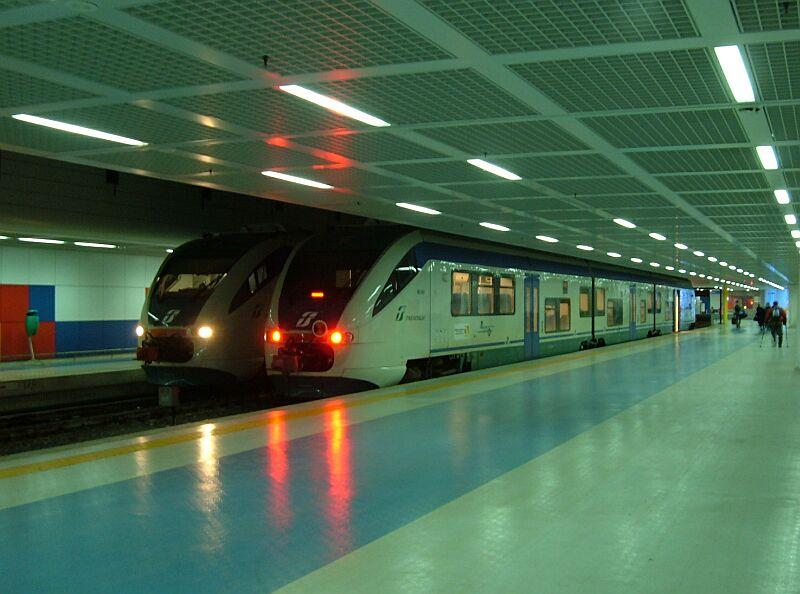
- Two Minuetto trains inside the station.

General information
- Location: Aeroporto Falcone e Borsellino; 90045 Cinisi PA; Cinisi, Palermo, Sicily; Italy
- Coordinates: 38°11′14″N 13°06′18″E
- Operator: Rete Ferroviaria Italiana
- Line: Palermo Passante railway
- Distance: 60.4 km (37.5 mi) from Roccella
- Platforms: 3
- Train operators: Trenitalia
- Connections: Palermo Airport; Metropolitana di Palermo; Local buses

Other information
- Classification: Silver

History
- Opened: 2004; 22 years ago
Location
- Location within Sicily Location within Italy

Palermo Aeroporto railway station (Italian: Stazione di Palermo Aeroporto), formerly known as Punta Raisi railway station, is located within Palermo Airport (Italian: Aeroporto di Palermo "Falcone e Borsellino") (IATA code: PMO) in Cinisi, near Palermo, Sicily, Italy. Opened in 2004, the station is the northwestern terminus of the Palermo Passante railway, and forms part of the Palermo Metro.

The station is managed by Rete Ferroviaria Italiana (RFI). Train services are operated by Trenitalia. Both companies are subsidiaries of Ferrovie dello Stato (FS), Italy's state-owned rail company.

== Location ==
Palermo Aeroporto railway station is situated underground, directly opposite the airport terminal, and is accessible through the terminal.

== History ==
The station is part of the extension of Metropolitana di Palermo Line A from Piraineto railway station to the airport. The construction of this extension began in 2001, and the station was opened in 2004.

== Features ==
The station is equipped with three platforms, all of them for passenger service.

== Train movements ==
Palermo Aeroporto is now the northwestern terminus of Line A. Trains operate between Punta Raisi and Palermo Centrale. On weekdays, a train runs in each direction approximately every 30 minutes between early morning and around 10 pm.

From mid-December 2023, two pairs of direct regional trains to Agrigento Centrale station have been activated. Furthermore, with the 2025 timetable change, a new evening train to Agrigento will be added, on the occasion of the Italian Capital of Culture for 2025.

== Services ==
The station has:

- Ticket office;
- Toilets;
- Bar;

== Gallery ==
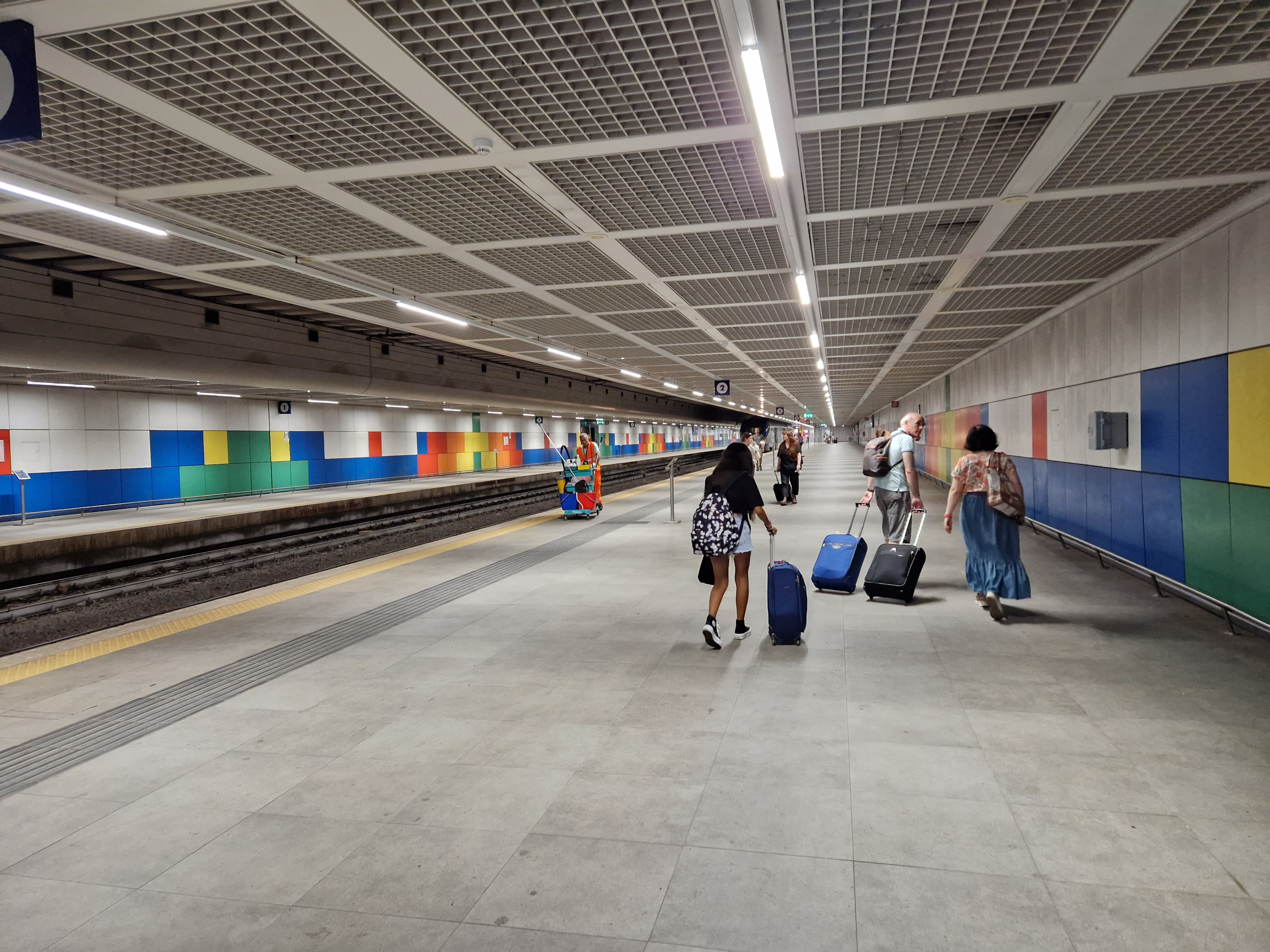
Platform 3

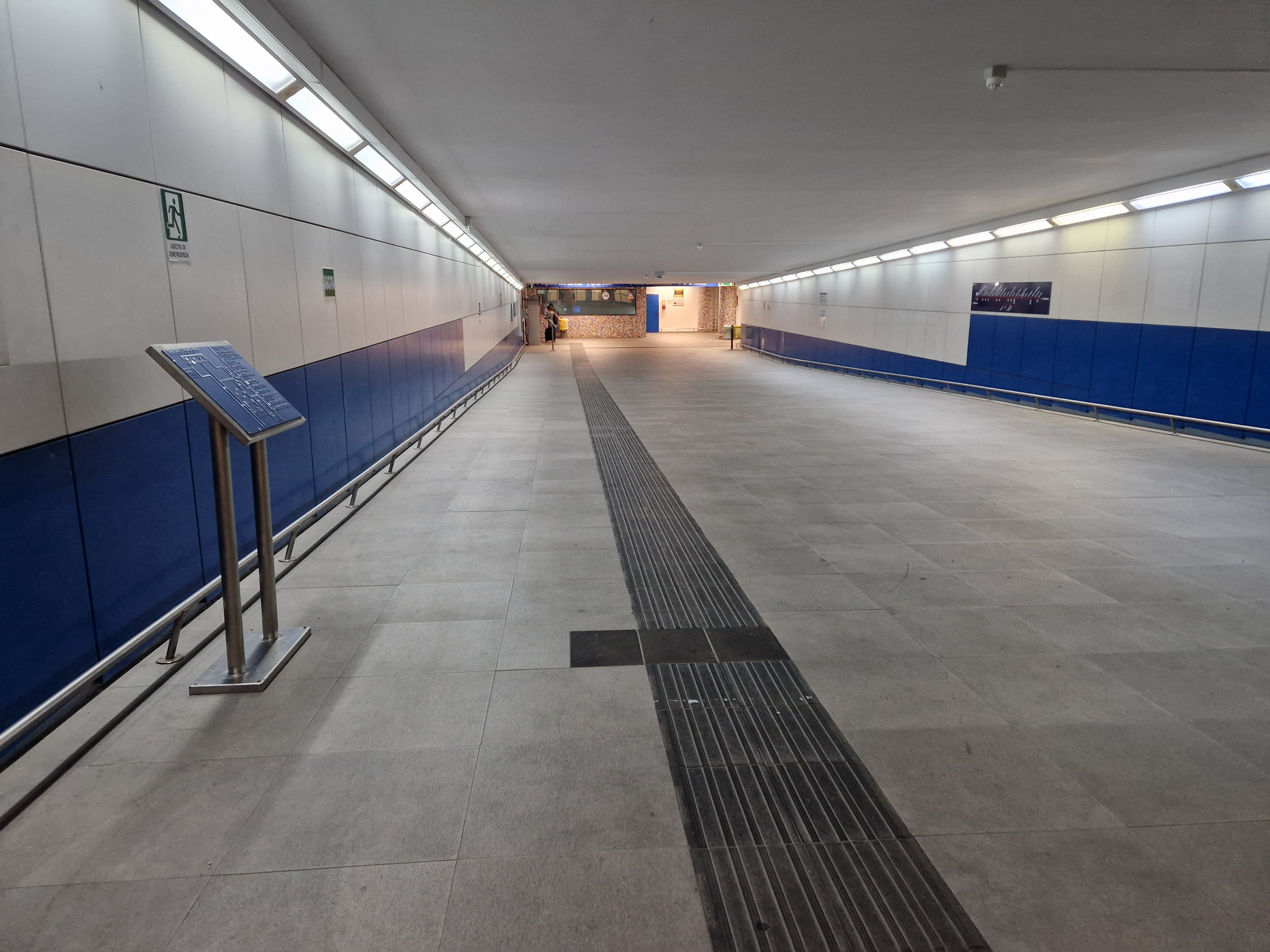
Station entrance

== See also ==
- History of rail transport in Italy
- List of railway stations in Sicily
- Rail transport in Italy
- Railway stations in Italy
