= Guadagna =

Coordinates: 38.1001°N 13.3691°E

Guadagna is a neighborhood within Palermo in the northern portion of Sicily.
