= Palermo metropolitan railway service =

Commuter rail system in Palermo, Italy

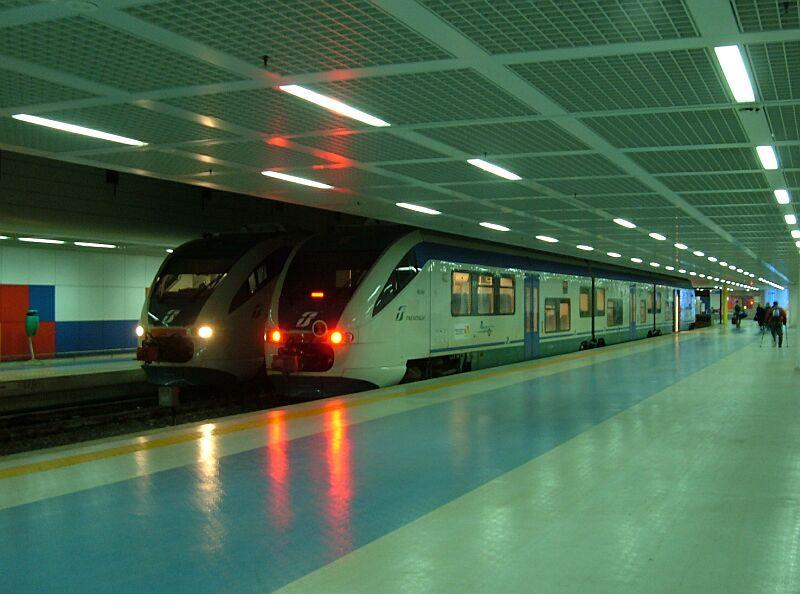
- Trains at Punta Raisi

Overview
- Locale: Palermo
- Transit type: commuter rail
- Number of lines: 2
- Number of stations: 16

Operation
- Began operation: 1990
- Operator: Trenitalia

Technical
- System length: 39.1 km (24.3 mi)
- Track gauge: 1,435 mm (4 ft 8 1/2 in) standard gauge
- Electrification: 3 kV DC, overhead line
System map

The Palermo metropolitan railway service is a commuter rail system operated by Trenitalia. It serves the city of Palermo in Sicily, Italy.

== Lines ==
There are two lines:

- Palermo Centrale – Punta Raisi (airport)
- Palermo Notarbartolo – Giachery

Both lines are served by a train every 30 minutes, although on the Palermo Centrale – Punta Raisi line some stops are served by half of the trains.

== History ==
The first section of the Palermo "metropolitana" was opened in 1990, a month before the beginning of Italia 90, the football World Cup. The line had only six stations: Palermo Centrale, Vespri, Palermo Notarbartolo, Federico, Fiera and Giachery. The line used the tracks of the old Palermo – Trapani railway, running across the city until Notarbartolo station, and from there it followed the branch to the port, along which new stops were built.

This line was also used to reach the Stadio Renzo Barbera (Stadio della Favorita) football stadium.

In November 1993 a new branch was opened, on the tracks of the railway to Trapani, running diesel railcars type ALn 668. The first two stops were San Lorenzo-Colli and Tommaso Natale. In 1994 stops at Francia and Cardillo-Zen were opened.

In 2001 a new tunnel station (Palazzo Reale-Orleans) was opened, serving the city centre. The metropolitan service was extended to Punta Raisi railway station, serving the Falcone Borsellino Airport.

== Projects ==
=== Palermo Centrale – Punta Raisi ===
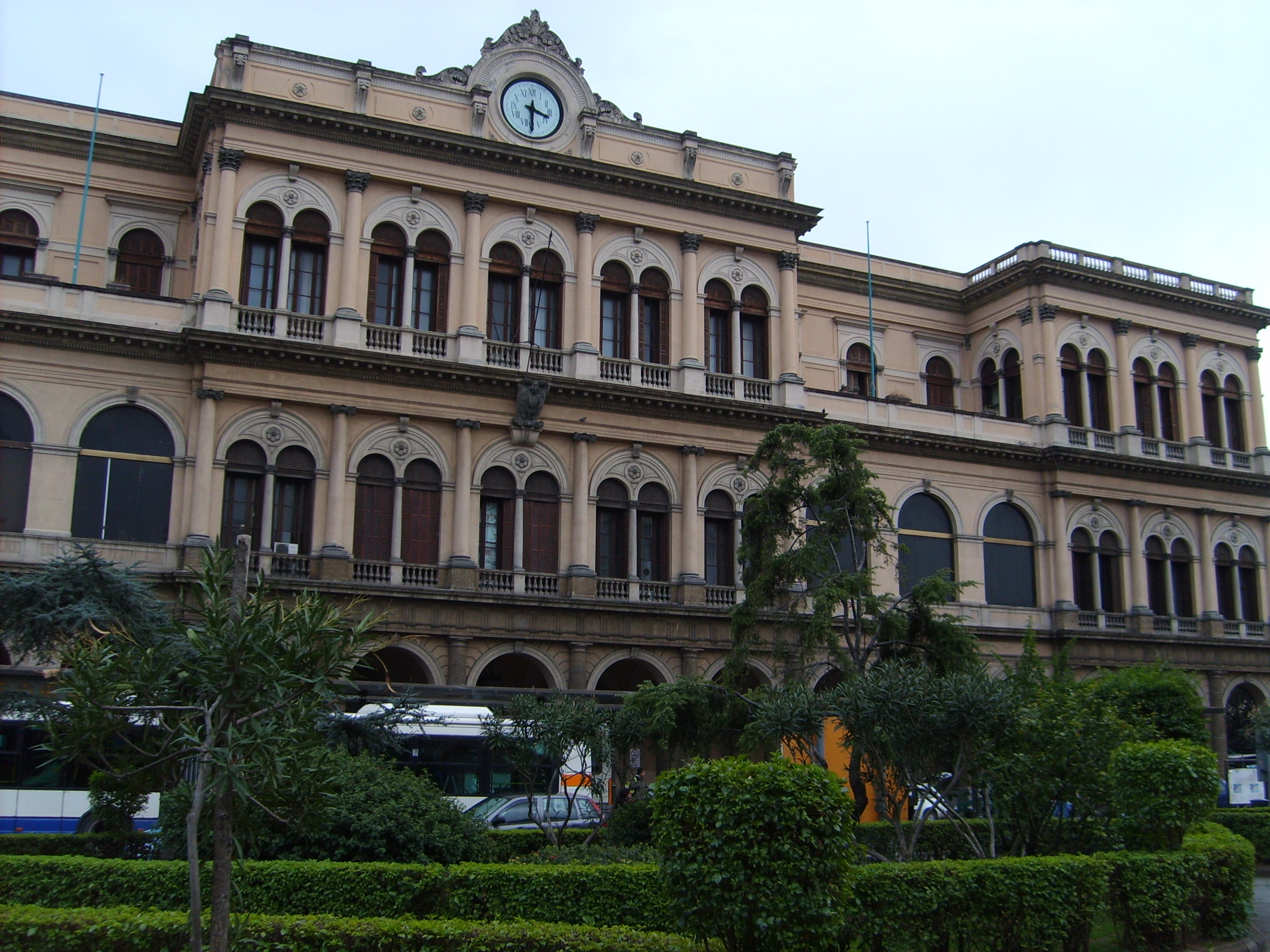
Palermo Centrale railway station

Improvements on this line began 22 February 2008.

- A second track is planned for the Palermo-Trapani route, which currently is only a single track between the Orleans and Carini stations. With the new track in place, there will be an increase in the number of trains and a reduction in journey times.
- The work includes removing all level crossings by lowering the track in some sections of the line and the construction of overpasses at other sections, constructing whichever is best at that location.
- Twelve stops will be added with new stations at Ficarazzi, Roccella, Guadagna, Palazzo di Giustizia, Lolli, Lazio-Restivo, Belgio, La Malfa, Sferracavallo, Kennedy, Torre Ciachea and Orsa.
- The line will also be extended to Ficarazzi, with connections through to Messina.

=== Palermo Notarbartolo – Giachery ===
This route was repaired in 1993.

On 4 November 2026, two new stops of the ring, Porto and Politeama (Piazza Castelnuovo), opened on the Giachery–Politeama section. The ring now has seven stops (Notarbartolo, Libertà, Imperatore Federico, Fiera, Giachery, Porto and Politeama), and rides between them are free until 31 January 2027. The ring is to be continued in 2027.

- The line will be completely transformed, forming a complete ring known as the Palermo Rail Ring, extending from Giachery to Notarbartolo with new stops at Porto and Malaspina Politeama-Catania.
- The new route will be underground.
- A new stop will open Lazio Libertà.
- This line will not get a second track.
- Work has stopped temporarily due to an appeal made by the firm that came in second when the contract was awarded.

== See also ==
- Palermo Centrale railway station
- List of rapid transit systems
