= Palermo Centrale railway station =

Railway station in Palermo, Italy

Palermo Centrale
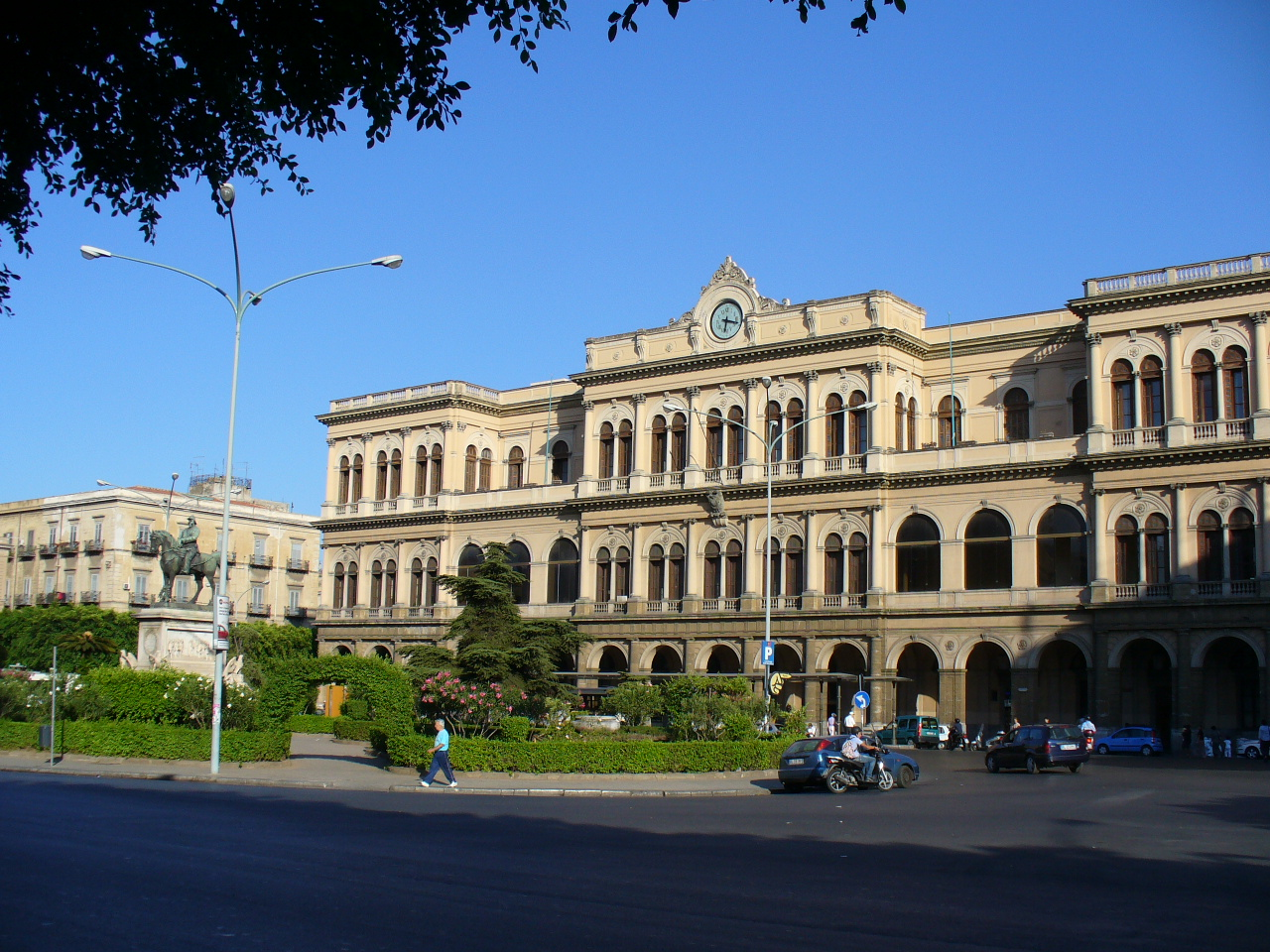
- Exterior of the railway station building.

General information
- Location: Piazza Giulio Cesare; 90127 Palermo; Palermo, Palermo, Sicily; Italy
- Coordinates: 38°06′36″N 13°22′01″E
- Owner: Rete Ferroviaria Italiana
- Operator: Grandi Stazioni
- Lines: Palermo–Messina; Palermo–Trapani; Palermo–Catania; Palermo–Agrigento
- Platforms: 10
- Train operators: Trenitalia
- Connections: AMAT buses

Other information
- Classification: Platinum

History
- Opened: 7 June 1886
Location
- Location within Sicily Location within Italy

Palermo Centrale is the main railway station of the Italian city of Palermo, capital of Sicily. It is one of the most important "FS" stations of Italy. Along with Catania Centrale, Messina Centrale and Syracuse it is one of the most important stations of its region. It is owned by the Ferrovie dello Stato, the national rail company of Italy.

== History ==
The railway station, designed by the Italian architect Di Giovanni, was opened on 7 June 1886. Still 1941 it was characterized by a big roof with a structure in iron and glass, substituted in the early 1950s with a reinforced concrete structure.

== Structure and transport ==
Palermo Centrale lies in the middle of the city, at Julius Caesar square (Piazza Giulio Cesare), and its building has a multi-level structure. It is a terminal station with 10 platforms for passenger service.

The station is situated on the lines Messina-Palermo and Palermo-Trapani. It is also the terminal of Palermo-Catania and Palermo-Agrigento lines.

As transport the Centrale is an important hub of regional services for Sicily, also served by the citizen subway which links it to the Airport of Punta Raisi. For long-distance transport it is the terminus of InterCity trains to Naples, Rome, Milan and still 1970s to Paris. It is still not served by Le Frecce trains, principally for its position on an island, but it is included in the project of Berlin–Palermo railway axis. Line 1 of Palermo's tram system terminates at the station.

== See also ==
- Palermo Notarbartolo station
- Metropolitana di Palermo
- Berlin–Palermo railway axis
- List of railway stations in Sicily
- Railway stations in Italy
- Rail transport in Italy
- History of rail transport in Italy
