= Palermo Notarbartolo railway station =

Railway station in Italy

Palermo Notarbartolo
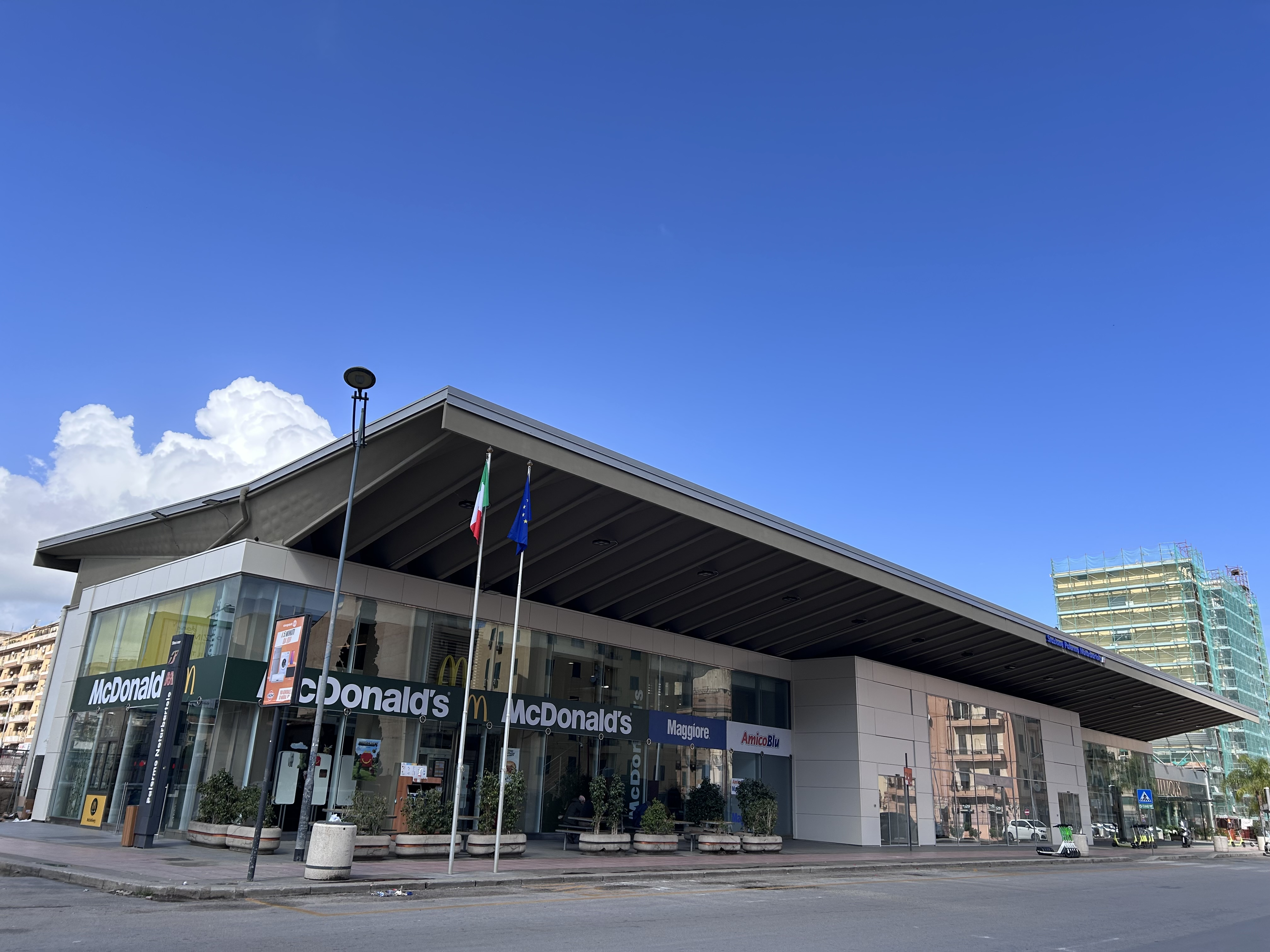
- The head house in 2025

General information
- Location: Piazza Matteo Maria Boiardo; 90144 Palermo PA; Palermo, Palermo, Sicily; Italy
- Coordinates: 38°07′57″N 13°20′31″E
- Operator: Rete Ferroviaria Italiana
- Lines: Palermo–Trapani; Palermo Notarbartolo–Palermo Giachery
- Distance: 6.512 km (4.046 mi) from Palermo Centrale
- Train operators: Trenitalia
- Connections: Local buses

Other information
- Classification: Gold

History
- Opened: 1974; 52 years ago
Location
- Location within Sicily Location within Italy

Palermo Notarbartolo (Italian: Stazione di Palermo Notarbartolo) is one of the main railway stations serving the city and comune of Palermo, capital of the region of Sicily in Italy. Opened in 1974, it is the second most important station in Palermo, after Palermo Centrale. It forms part of the Palermo–Trapani railway, and is also the junction station for a branch line to Palermo Giachery.

The station is currently managed by Rete Ferroviaria Italiana (RFI). Train services are operated by Trenitalia. Each of these companies is a subsidiary of Ferrovie dello Stato (FS), Italy's state-owned rail company.

== Location ==
Palermo Notarbartolo railway station is situated at Piazza Matteo Maria Boiardo, to the north west of the Palermo city centre. It takes its name from Via Notarbartolo, one of the most important streets in Palermo.

== History ==
The station was opened in 1974. Work on its construction had begun in the 1930s, but had been suspended during World War II. After several vicissitudes, the work had later resumed, and was brought to fruition in the 1970s. With the opening of the Notarbartolo station, the old Palermo Lolli station, located in Piazza Lolli, was decommissioned.

The station was created as part of modifications to Palermo's rail infrastructure arrangements. These modifications were aimed at streamlining the traffic affected by about 10 level crossings that had actually "cut the town in two". To solve this problem, the lines were placed deep underground.

In the 1990s, a metro-link to Palermo Notarbartolo was opened from Palermo Centrale, in Piazza Giachery. It uses the existing underground route of the old Bivio–Olivuzza–Porto railway, and touches most of the city.

Currently under construction is another railway link that will connect a further big chunk of the city (the south-west).

== Facilities ==
The architectural design of the station is very special, as it has only a head house at street level, while the rest of the station, including the tracks, are far below street level. There are seven platforms in total.

Italferr has recently started renovation work on the station that will radically alter its face, and make it part of a small shopping centre.

== Interchange ==
The station is served by the Palermo metropolitan railway service. Three of Palermo's four tram lines terminate at the station. There is also a bus terminal for local buses.

== See also ==
- History of rail transport in Italy
- List of railway stations in Sicily
- Rail transport in Italy
- Railway stations in Italy
