= Porto metro station =

Metro station in Catania, Italy

Porto
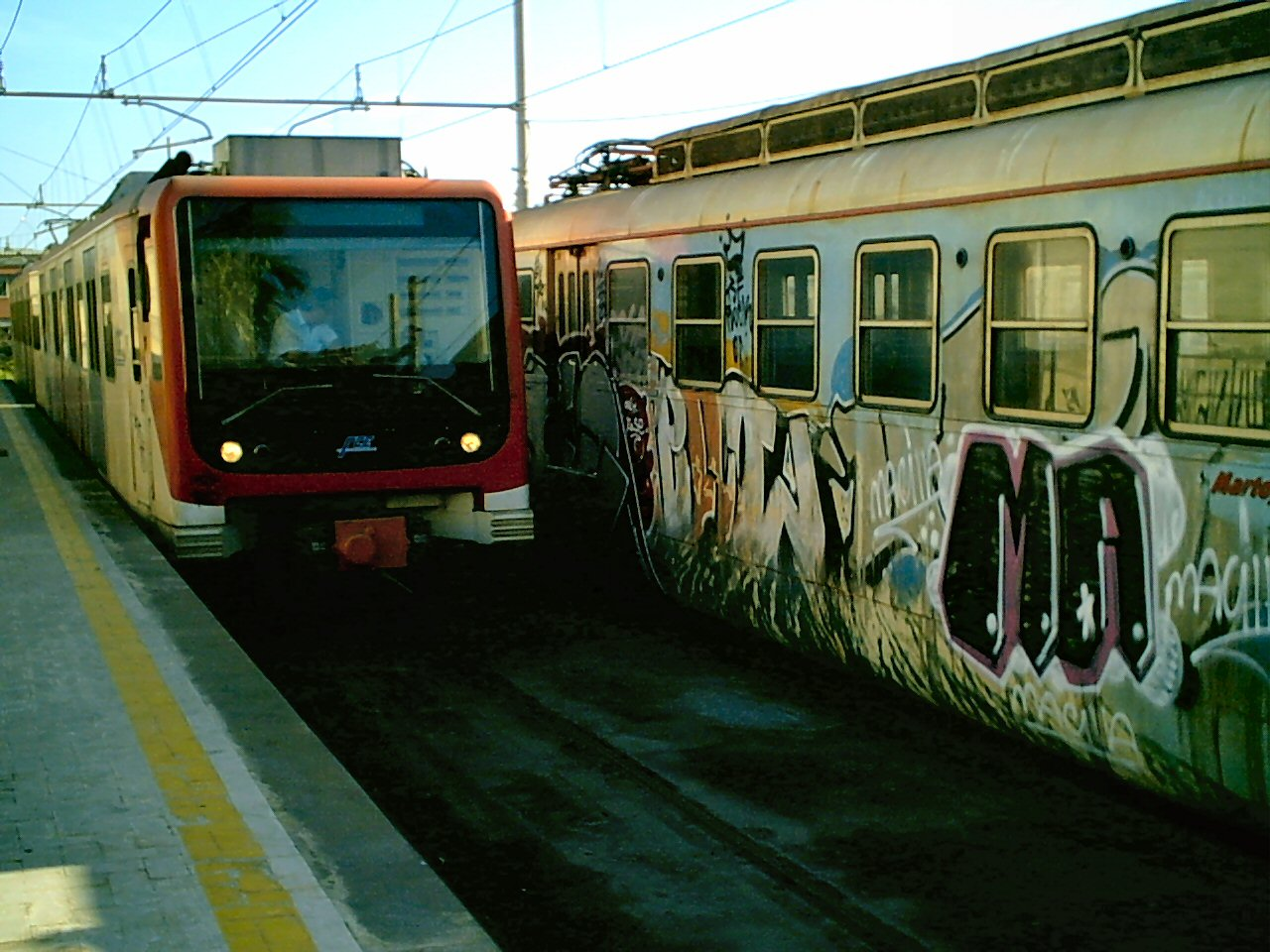

General information
- Location: Catania; Sicily, Italy
- Coordinates: 37°30′06″N 15°05′42″E
- Owner: Ferrovia Circumetnea

Construction
- Structure type: Surface

History
- Opened: 27 June 1999
- Closed: 19 December 2016 (due to construction)
- Rebuilt: 19 December 2016 - TBD

Services
Preceding station	Catania Metro	Following station
Catania Centrale towards Nesima	Catania Metro	Terminus
Location

Porto metro station is located in Catania in Sicily, southern Italy. It is served by the Catania Metro. Due to the extension of the metro towards Piazza Stesicoro, the station is temporarily closed.
