= Galatea metro station =

Metro station in Catania, Italy

Galatea
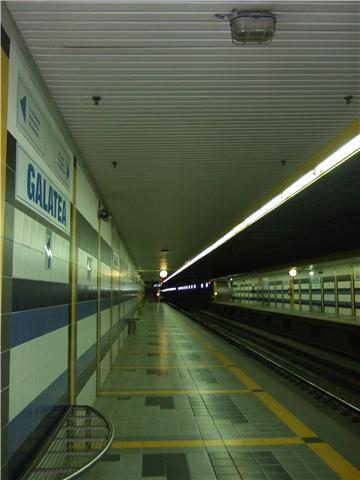

General information
- Location: Viale Jonio, Catania; Sicily, Italy
- Coordinates: 37°30′51″N 15°06′09″E
- Owner: Ferrovia Circumetnea

Construction
- Structure type: Underground

History
- Opened: June 27, 1999

Services
Preceding station	Catania Metro	Following station
Italia towards Nesima	Catania Metro	Giovanni XIII towards Stesicoro
Location

Galatea metro station is located in Catania in Sicily, southern Italy. It is served by the Catania Metro and it was opened the 11th of July 1999. It serves the urban zone of piazza Galatea, viale Jonio, via Pasubio and surroundings and actually is the 4th station of the Borgo-Porto line. It is the 8th station of the Nesima-Stesicoro line. It is located at 500m from the seafront.
