= Giuffrida metro station =

Metro station in Catania, Italy

Giuffrida
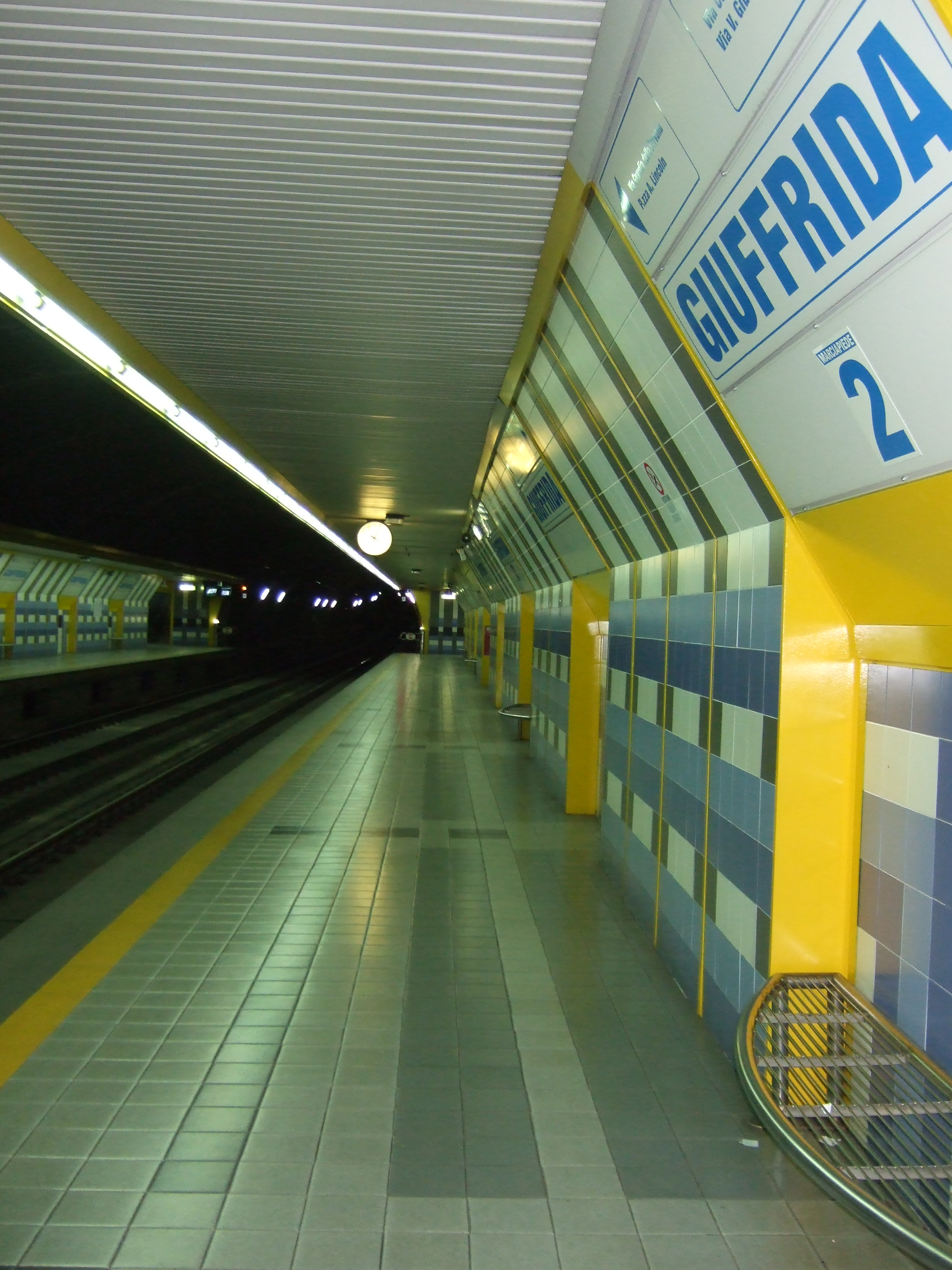

General information
- Location: Corso delle Provincie at Via Cagliari, Catania; Sicily, Italy
- Coordinates: 37°31′14″N 15°05′25″E
- Owner: Ferrovia Circumetnea

Construction
- Structure type: Underground

History
- Opened: 27 June 1999

Services
Preceding station	Catania Metro	Following station
Borgo towards Nesima	Catania Metro	Italia towards Stesicoro
Location

Giuffrida metro station is located in Catania in Sicily, southern Italy. It is served by the Catania Metro.
