= Italia metro station =

Metro station in Catania, Italy

Italia
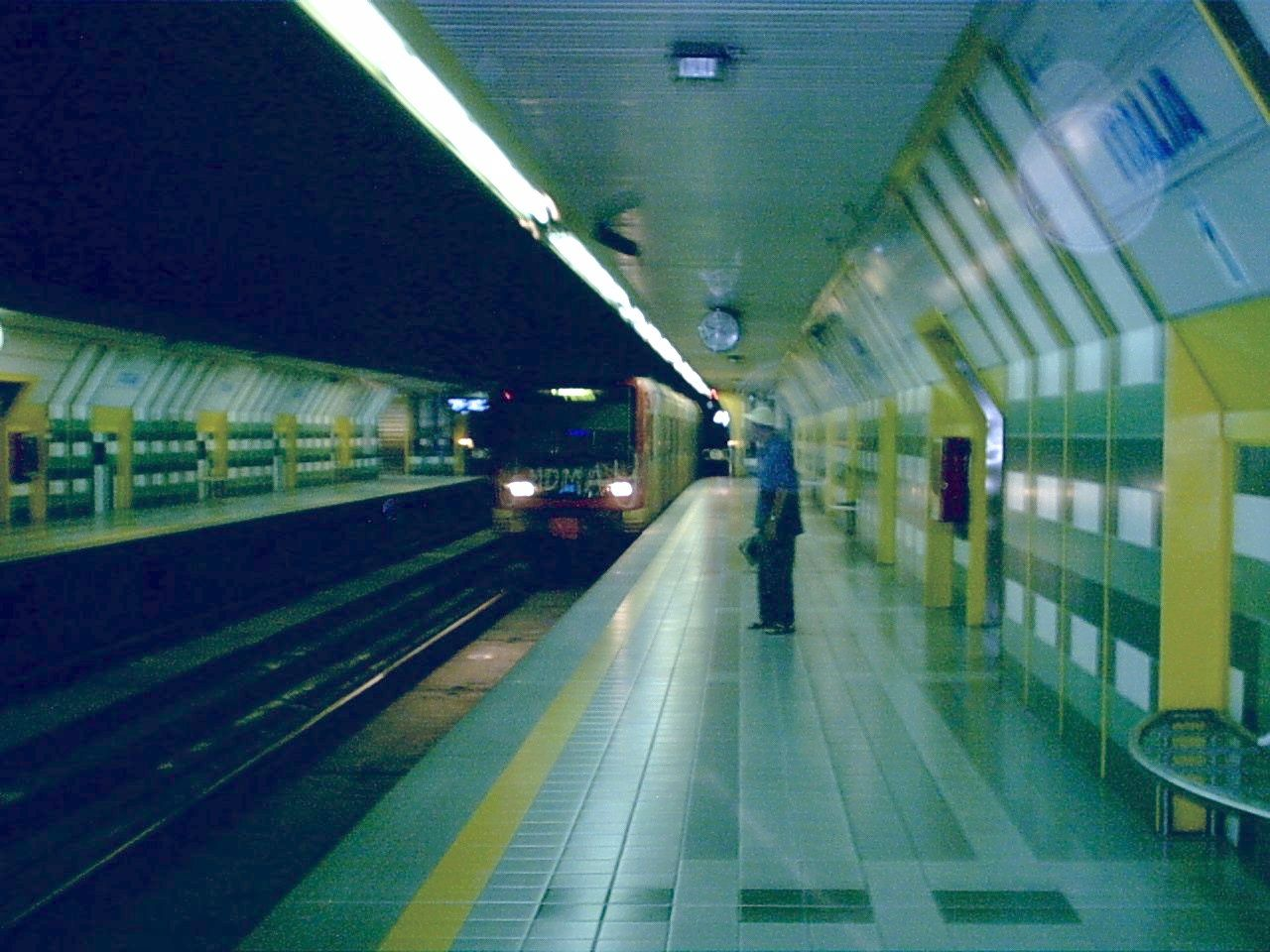

General information
- Location: Catania; Sicily, Italy
- Coordinates: 37°30′57.5″N 15°05′50″E
- Owner: Ferrovia Circumetnea

Construction
- Structure type: Underground

History
- Opened: 27 June 1999

Services
Preceding station	Catania Metro	Following station
Giuffrida towards Nesima	Catania Metro	Galatea towards Stesicoro
Location

Italia metro station is located in Catania in Sicily, southern Italy. It is served by the Catania Metro.
