= Borgo metro station =

Metro station in Catania, Italy

Borgo
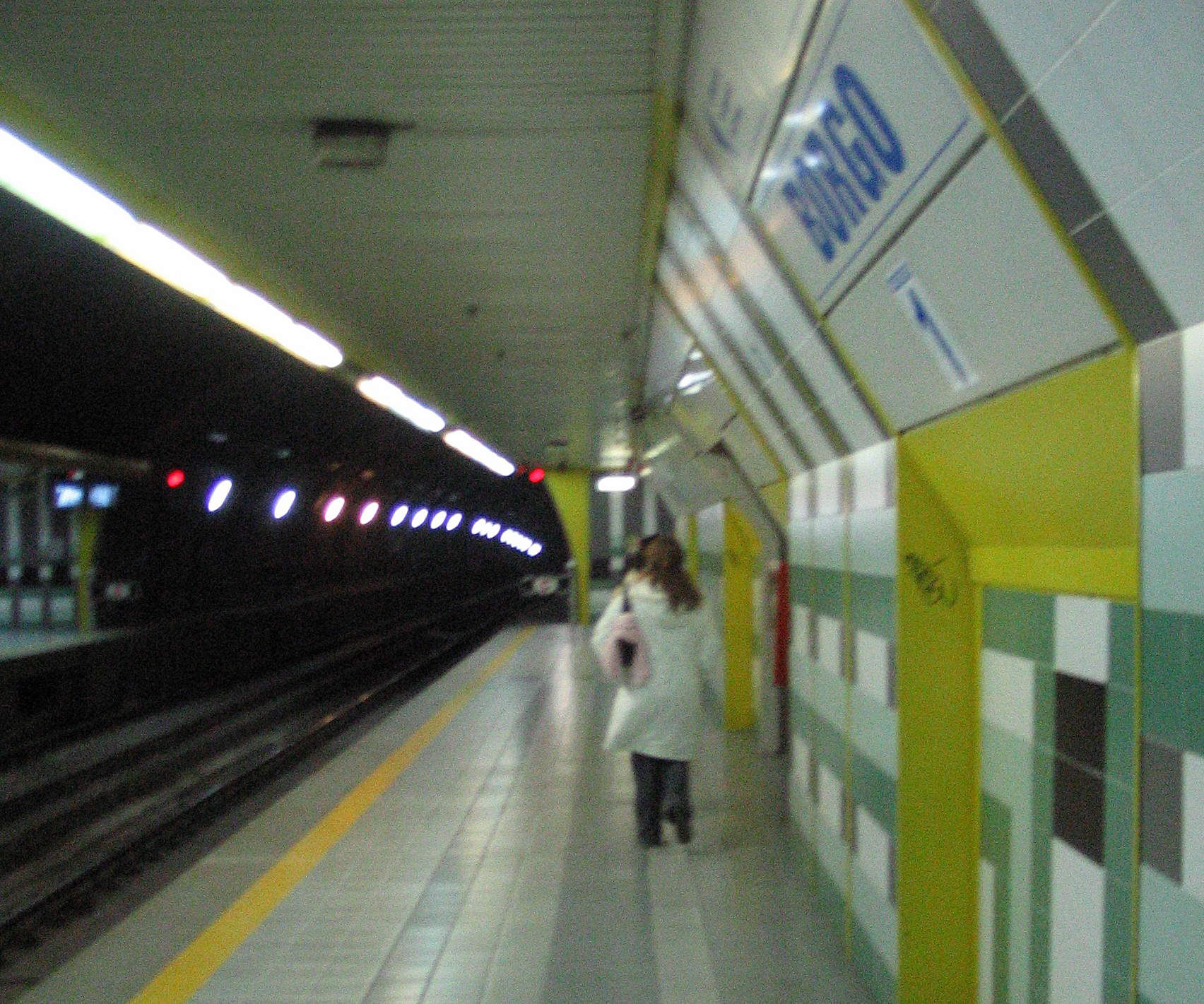

General information
- Location: Via Signorelli, Catania; Sicily, Italy
- Coordinates: 37°31′17″N 15°05′05″E
- Owner: Ferrovia Circumetnea

Construction
- Structure type: Underground

History
- Opened: 27 June 1999

Services
Preceding station	Catania Metro	Following station
Milo towards Nesima	Catania Metro	Giuffrida towards Stesicoro
Location

Borgo metro station is located in Catania in Sicily, southern Italy. It is served by the Catania Metro and the FCE Line to Riposto.
