= Swan fan Makkum =

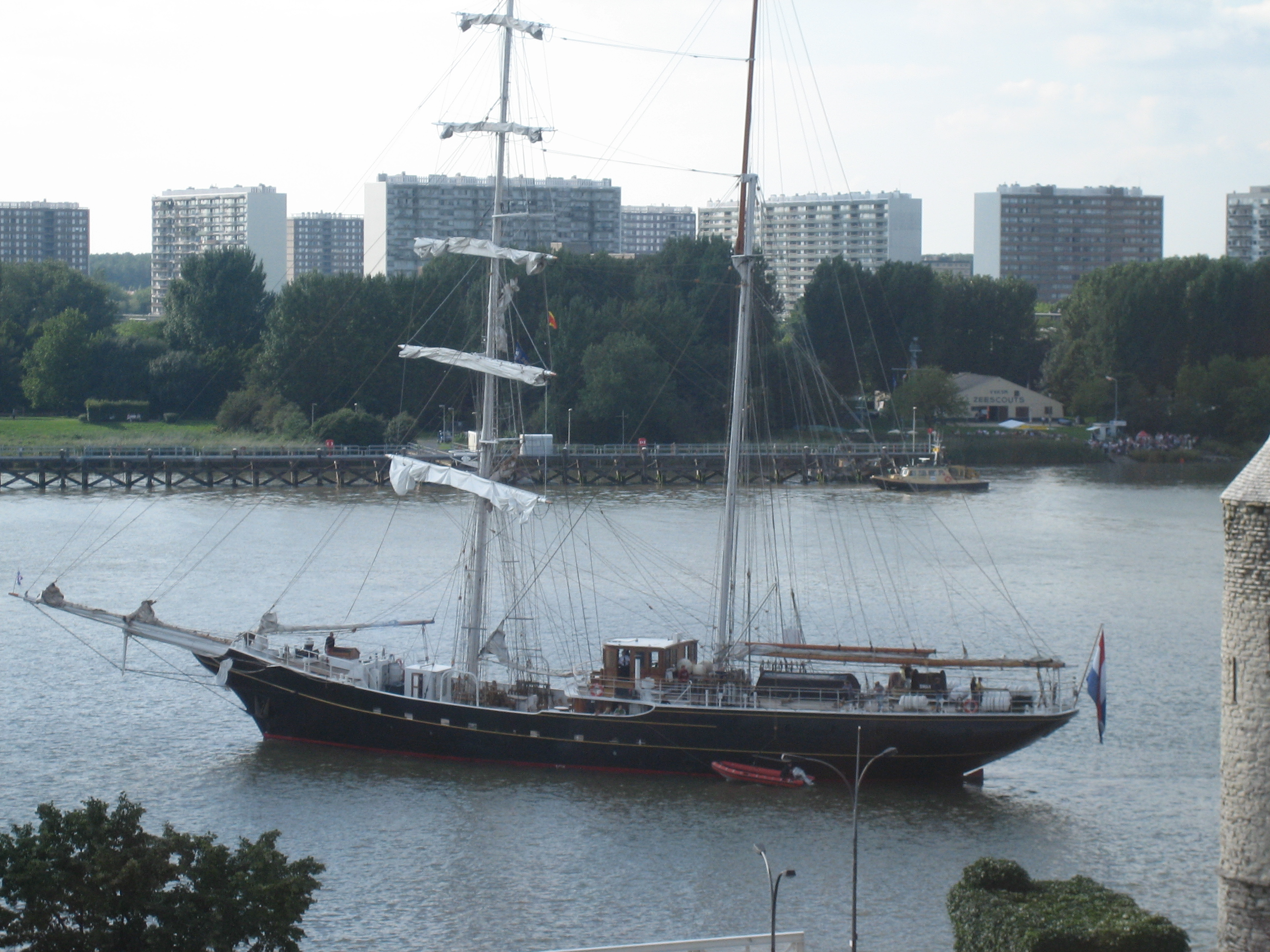

History
- Name: Swan fan Makkum (1993–2006); Nave Italia (2006–today)
- Builder: Gdansk Shipyard
- Launched: 1993
- Sponsored by: Hinke de Vries
- Identification: IMO number: 8872825

General characteristics
- Tonnage: 404 GT
- Length: 61 m (200 ft)
- Sail plan: Brigantine 1,300 square metres (14,000 sq ft)

Swan fan Makkum is a brigantine, built in 1993 in the Gdansk shipyard, Poland. Named for Willem Sligting, Makkum, christened by Hinke de Vries, co-owner and wife, in a multilingual fashion: English, Polish and Frysian and after the ceremony launched in the river Wisła. She is the largest brigantine in the world, as well as the largest two masted sailing vessel, with an overall length of 61 metres (200 ft).

She carries a maximum of 1,300 square metres (14,000 sq ft) of sail, and with an air draft of 44 metres (144 ft) is one of the tallest of the tall ships. She currently operates as a charter vessel in Europe. She has crossed the Atlantic Ocean 18 times and has passaged in 2007 over 300,000 miles (480,000 km) since she was built. She has made regular appearances at major sailing events around the world and competes in at least part of the Tall Ships Race series every year.

The ship was during building full equipend with GMDSS radio equipment for sea-area A3 and 2 main gensets from 40 kW each and an auxiliary genset in the foxhole

Swan fan Makkum was sold February 6, 2006 to Italy and renamed Italia. She will continue to appear as a competitor in the Tall Ships Race, her first appearance as Nave Italia was in the 2007 Mediterranean series. She is now jointly operated by the Italian Navy and the Yacht Club Italiano.

After the sale of Swan fan Makkum, Willem Sligting and Hinke de Vries built a new tall ship: Wylde Swan.
