= Italian training ship Italia =

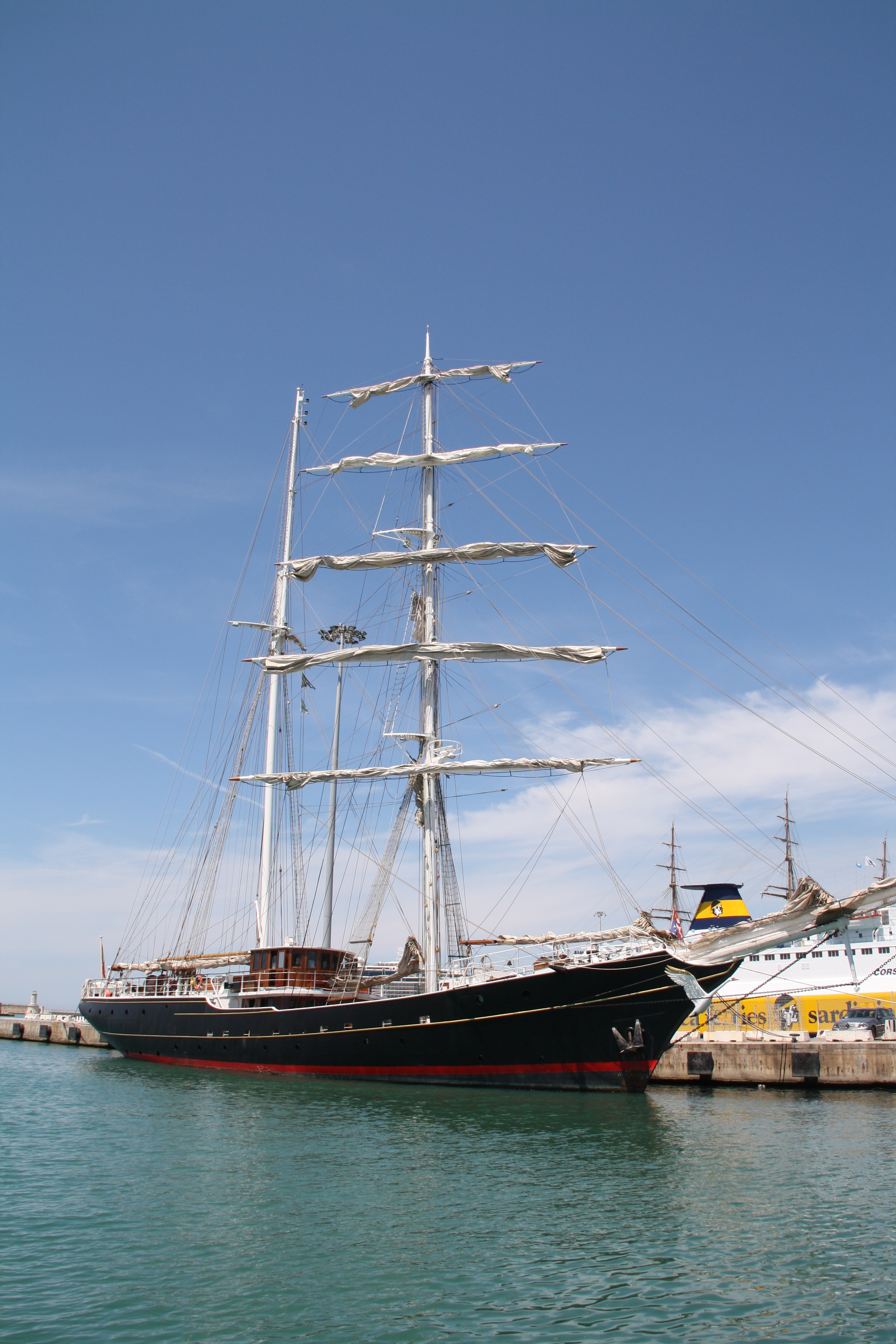

History

Italy
- Name: Italia (A5314)
- Owner: Fondazione tender to nave Italia
- Operator: Marina Militare
- Builder: Wiswa shipyard (Gdańsk, Poland)
- Laid down: 1992
- Launched: 30 March 1993
- Commissioned: 1993
- Recommissioned: 19 March 2007
- In service: 1
- Renamed: Swan fan Makkum (1993), Italia (2007)
- Identification: IMO number: 8872825; MMSI number: 247204900; Callsign: IASW
- Motto: Sursum corda
- Status: in service
- Notes: Pennant number A5314

General characteristics
- Type: Brigantine
- Tonnage: 404 GT
- Length: - 61.0 m (200 ft 2 in) LOA; - 53.7 m (176 ft 2 in) LPP
- Beam: 9.16 m (30 ft 1 in)
- Height: 44.6 m (146 ft 4 in) at mainmast
- Draught: 3.85 m (12 ft 8 in)
- Sail plan: n. 14 - 1,300 square metres (14,000 square feet)
- Speed: 6.5 knots (12.0 km/h; 7.5 mph)
- Endurance: 15 days on engine prop with good weather
- Complement: - 45, of which: - 21 crew; - 24 guests
- Notes: - 1 x diesel engine Caterpillar D353, 357.94 kW (480.01 bhp); - 1 x shaft; - 2 x diesel engine generators Mitsubishi, 57 kW (76 bhp); - 1 x Bow thrust

Italia is a brigantine, where projects are carried out to fully develop the potential of people with disabilities or social disadvantage. The Ship is led by personnel from the Italian Navy.

It is owned by Fondazione tender to nave Italia, a non-profit foundation for maritime contest development, with property by Fondazione Tender To Nave Italia.

== History ==
Built at the shipyard Wiswa, Gdańsk (Poland) as Swan fan Makkum it is a Brigantine.

Named for Willem Sligting, Makkum, christened by Hinke de Vries, co-owner and wife, in a multilingual fashion: English, Polish and Frysian and after the ceremony launched in the river Wisla.

She is the largest brigantine in the world, as well as the largest two masted sailing vessel, with an overall length of 61 metres (200 ft).

She carries a maximum of 1,300 square metres (14,000 square feet) of sail, and with an air draft of 44.6 metres (144 ft) is one of the tallest of the tall ships.

Swan fan Makkum was sold 6 February 2007 to Fondazione tender to nave Italia and renamed Nave Italia, commissioned to Italian Navy on 19 March 2007.

She will continue to appear as a competitor in the Tall Ships Race, her first appearance as Nave Italia was in the 2007 Mediterranean series.

== Gallery ==
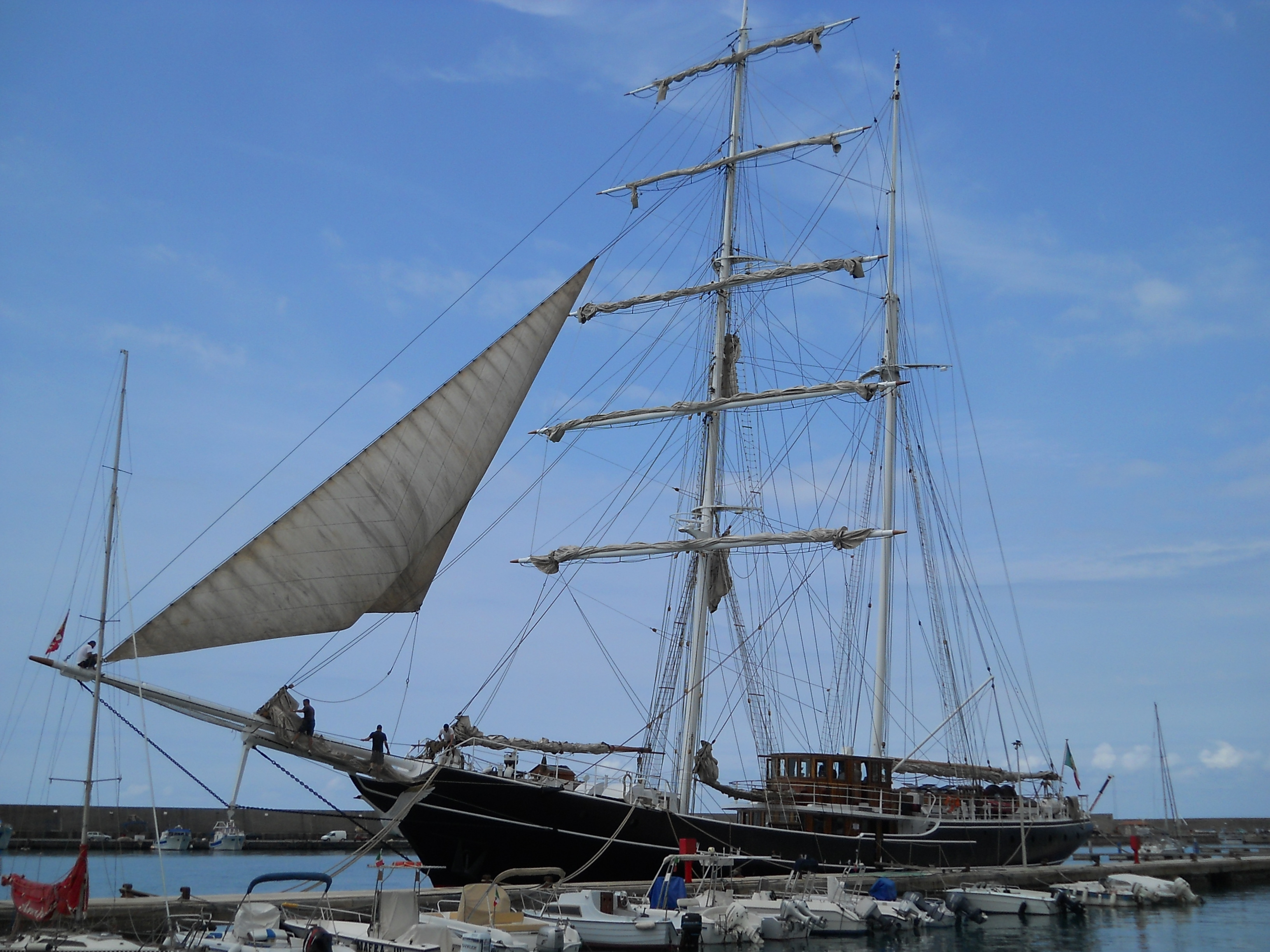
The ship docked at Cetraro.

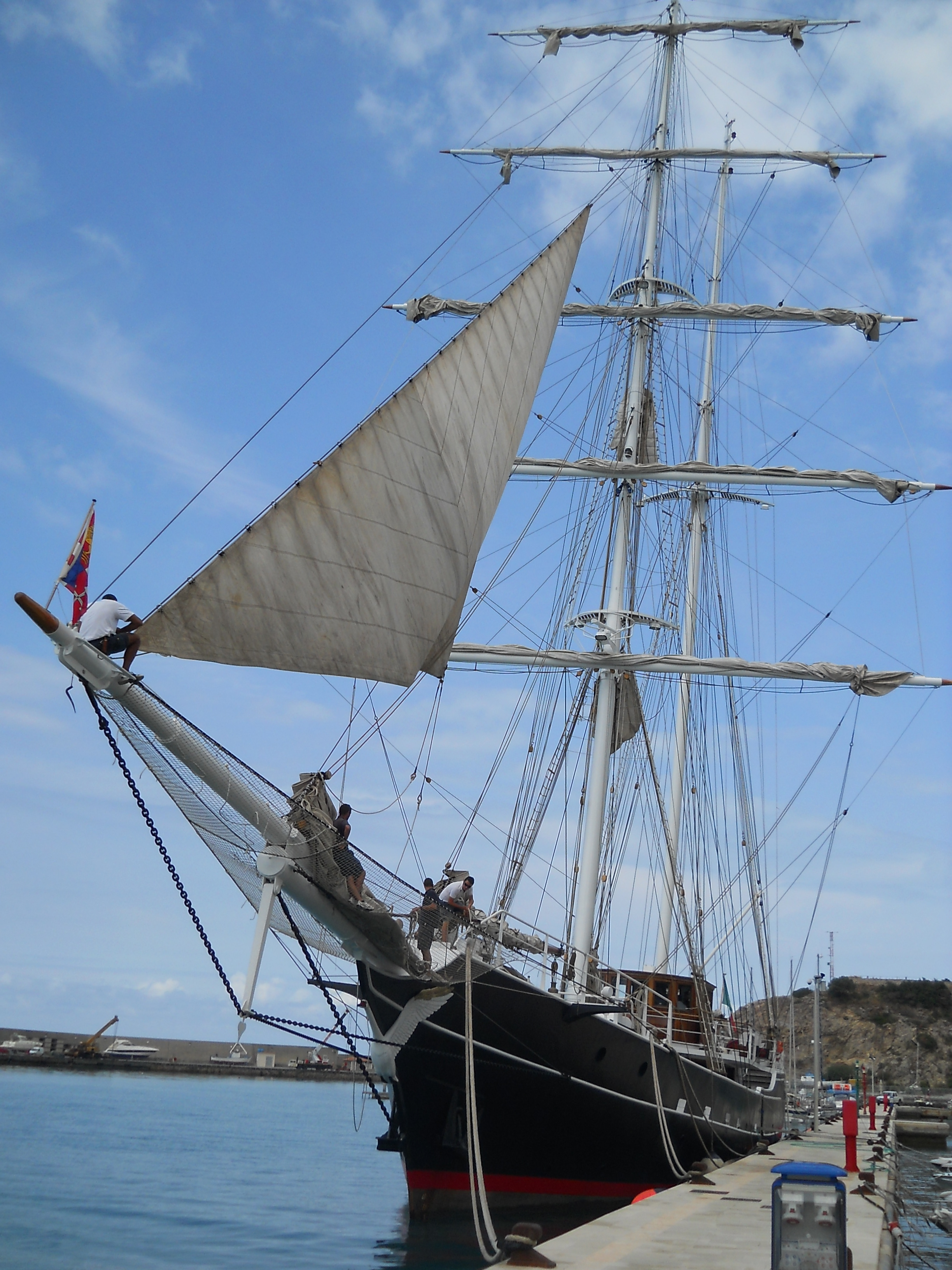

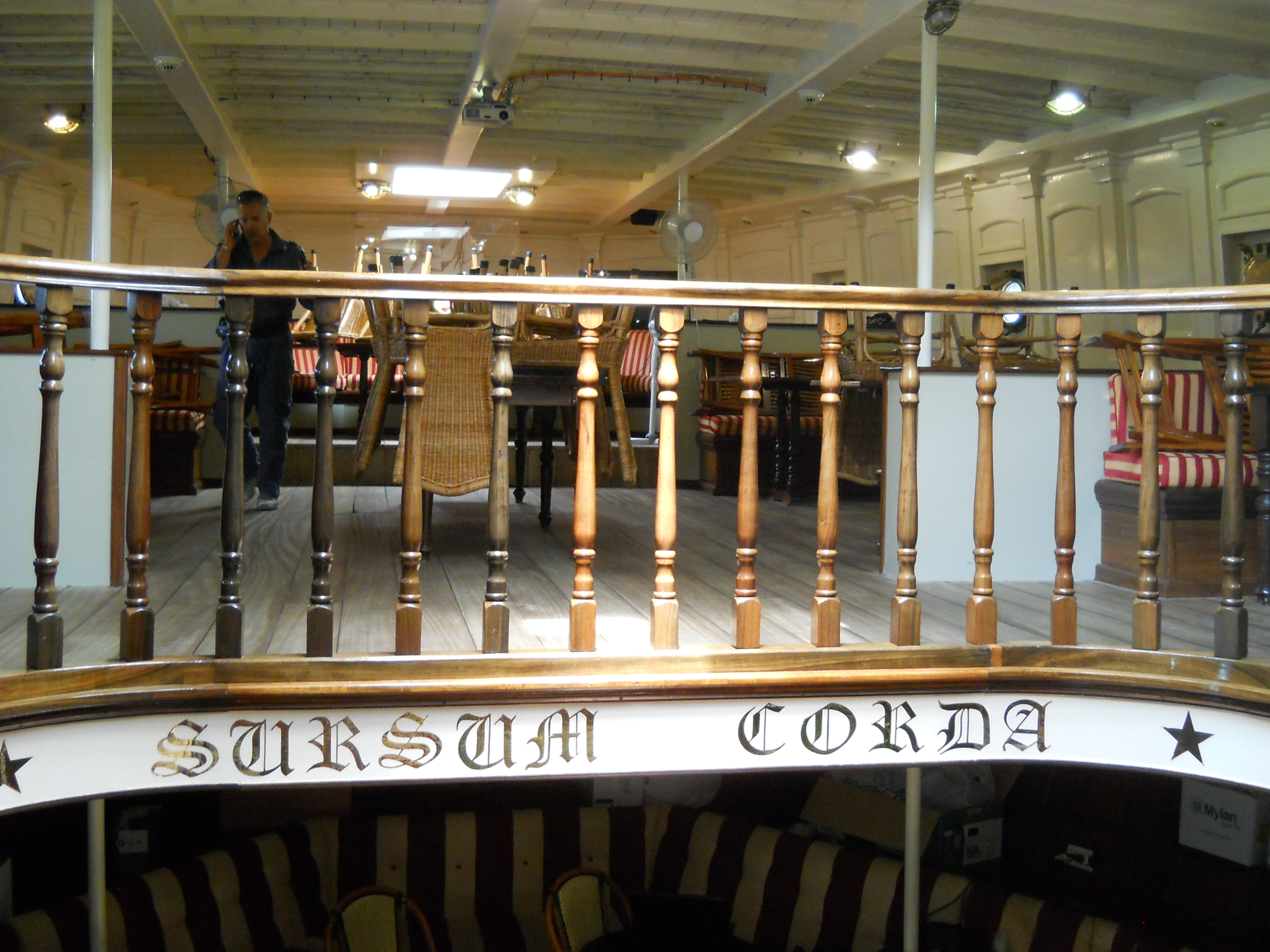
The motto: Sursum Corda

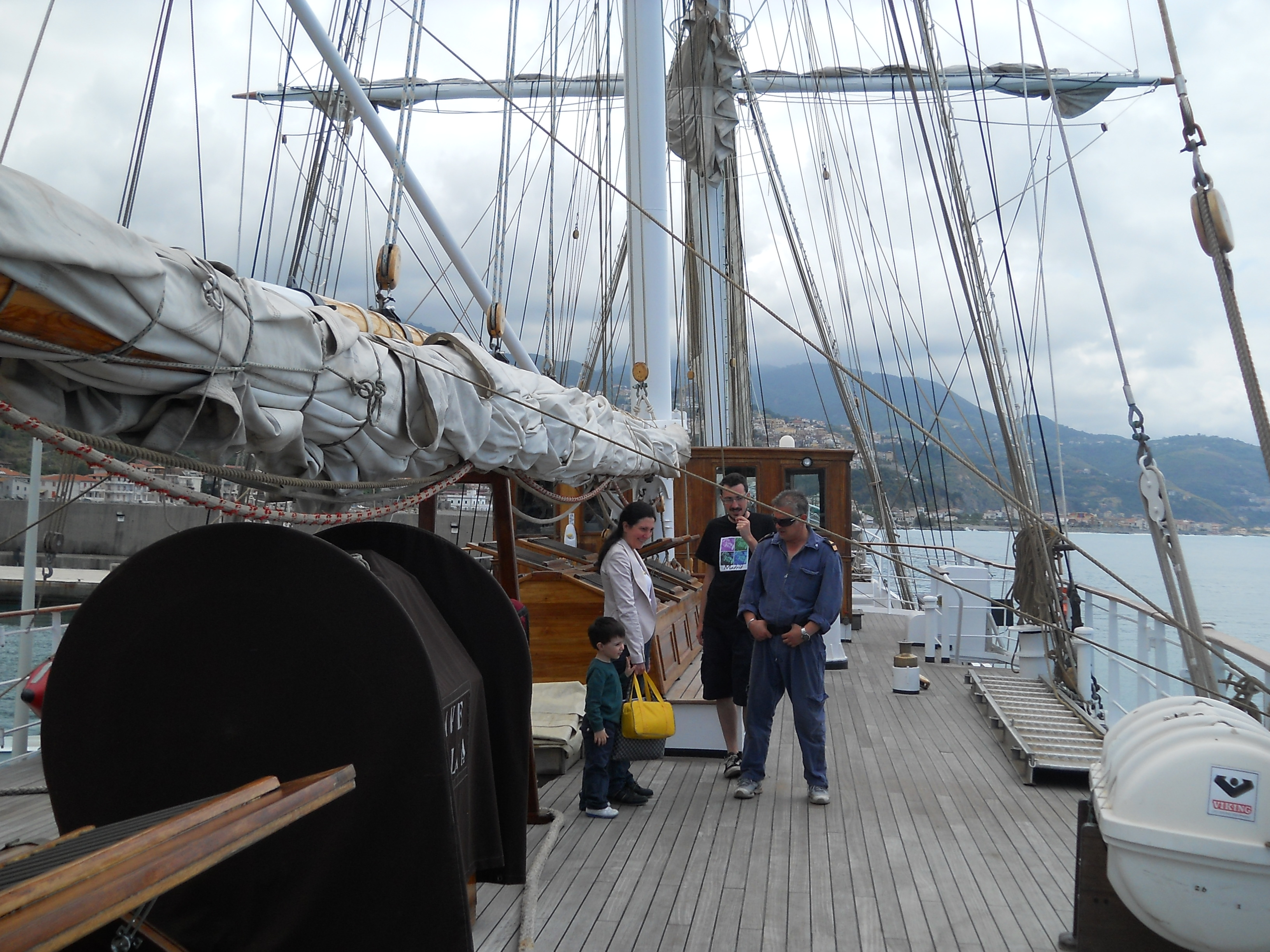
The Bridge

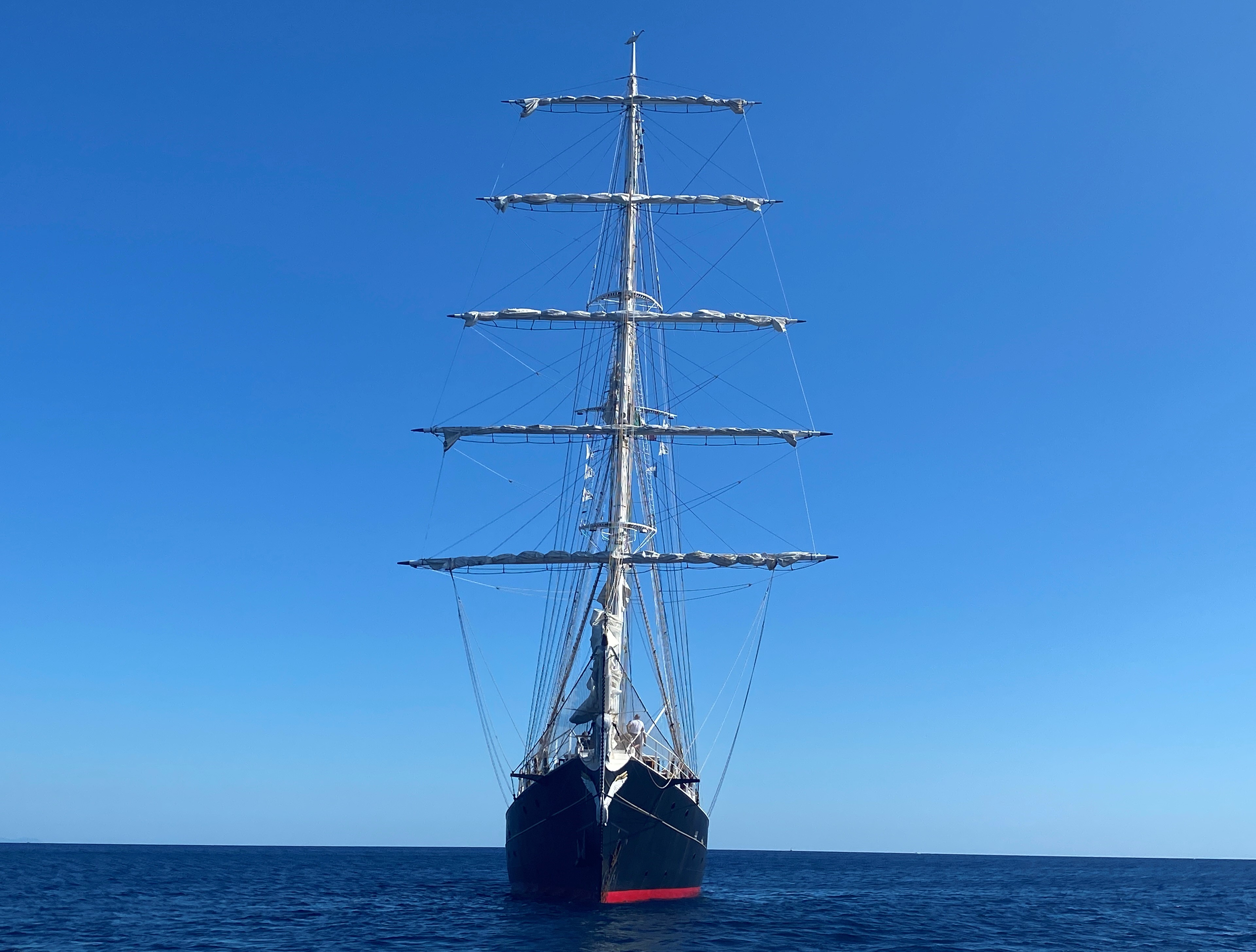
The ship, sailing in Marina di Campo, Isola d'Elba, 2020.

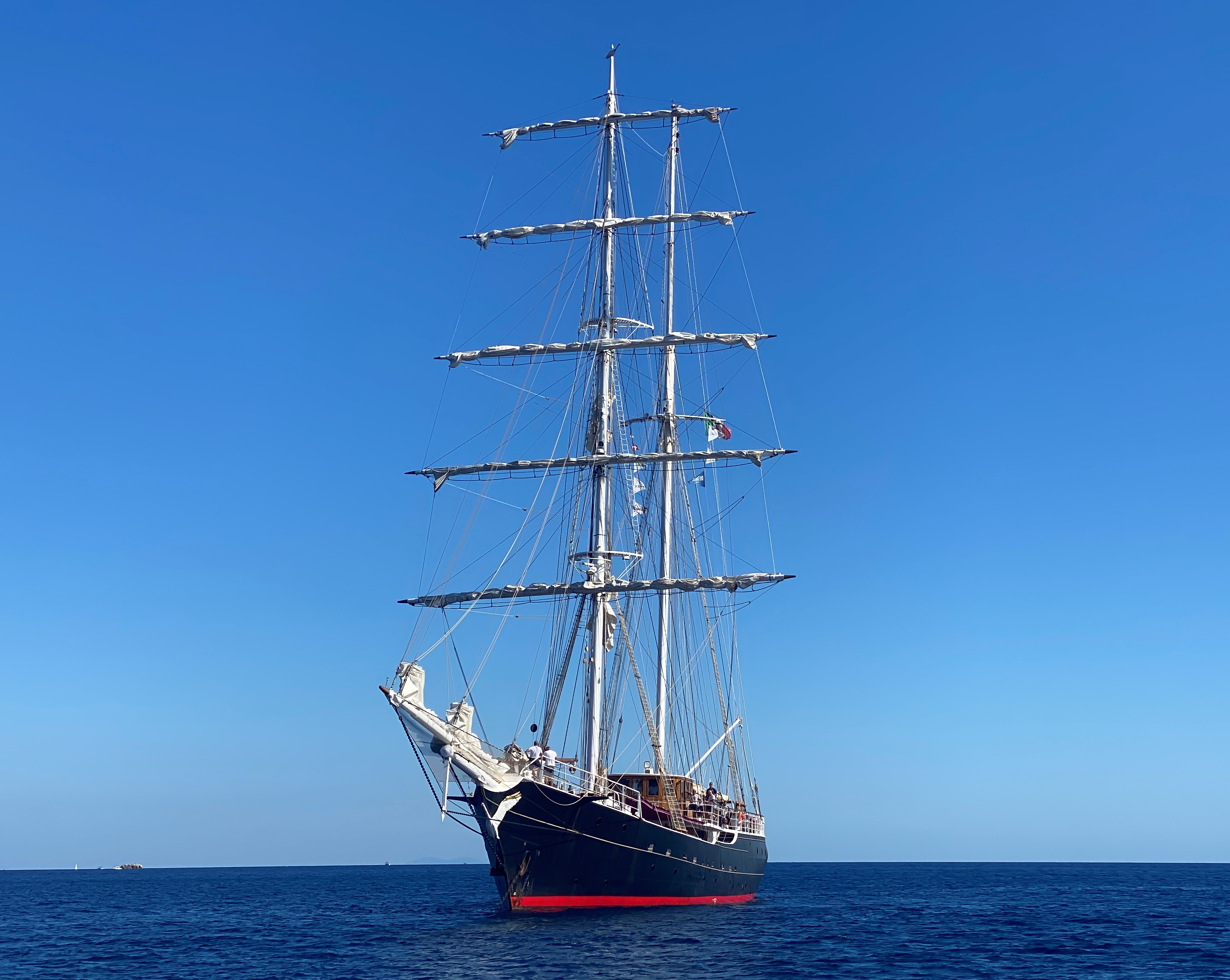

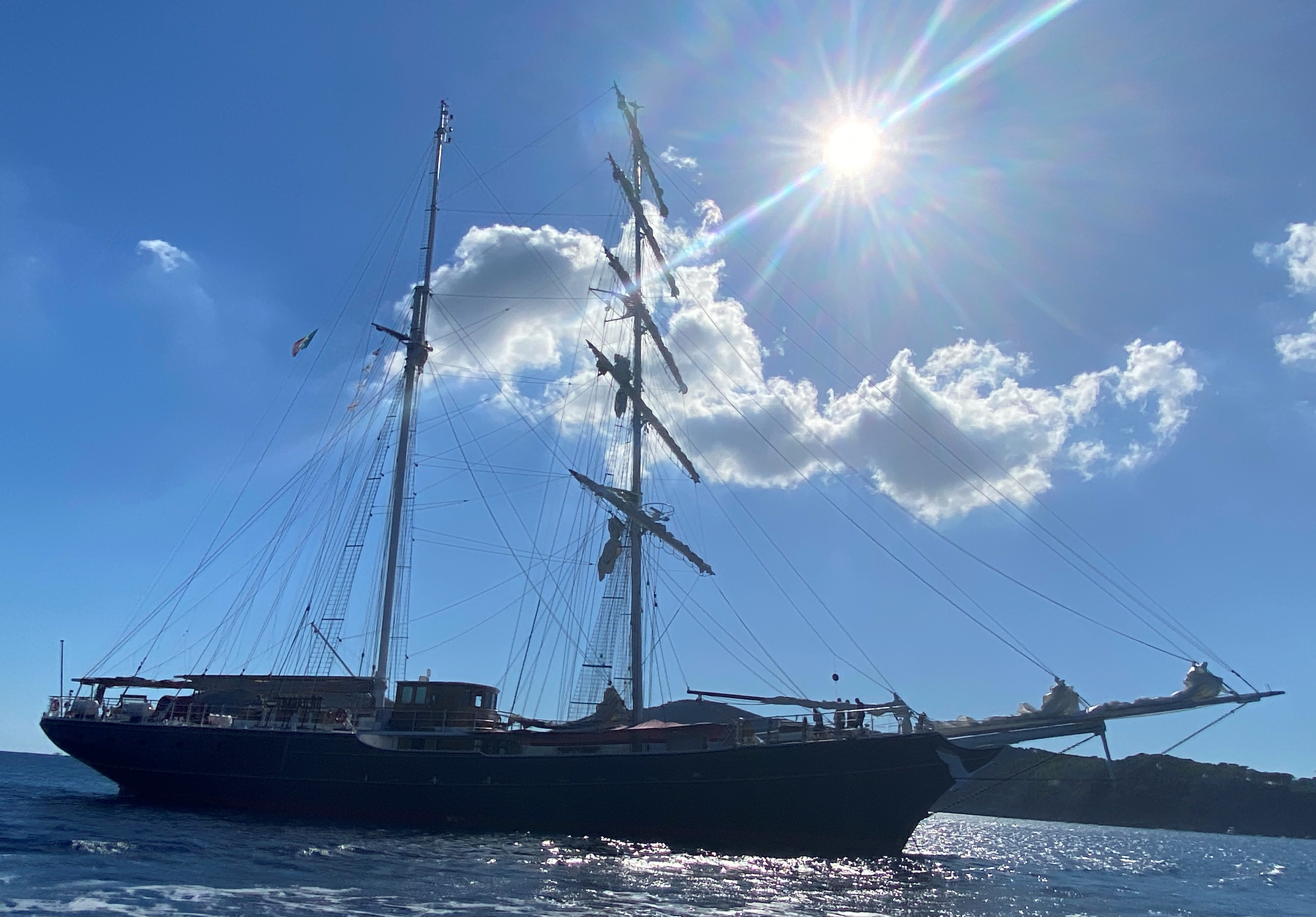

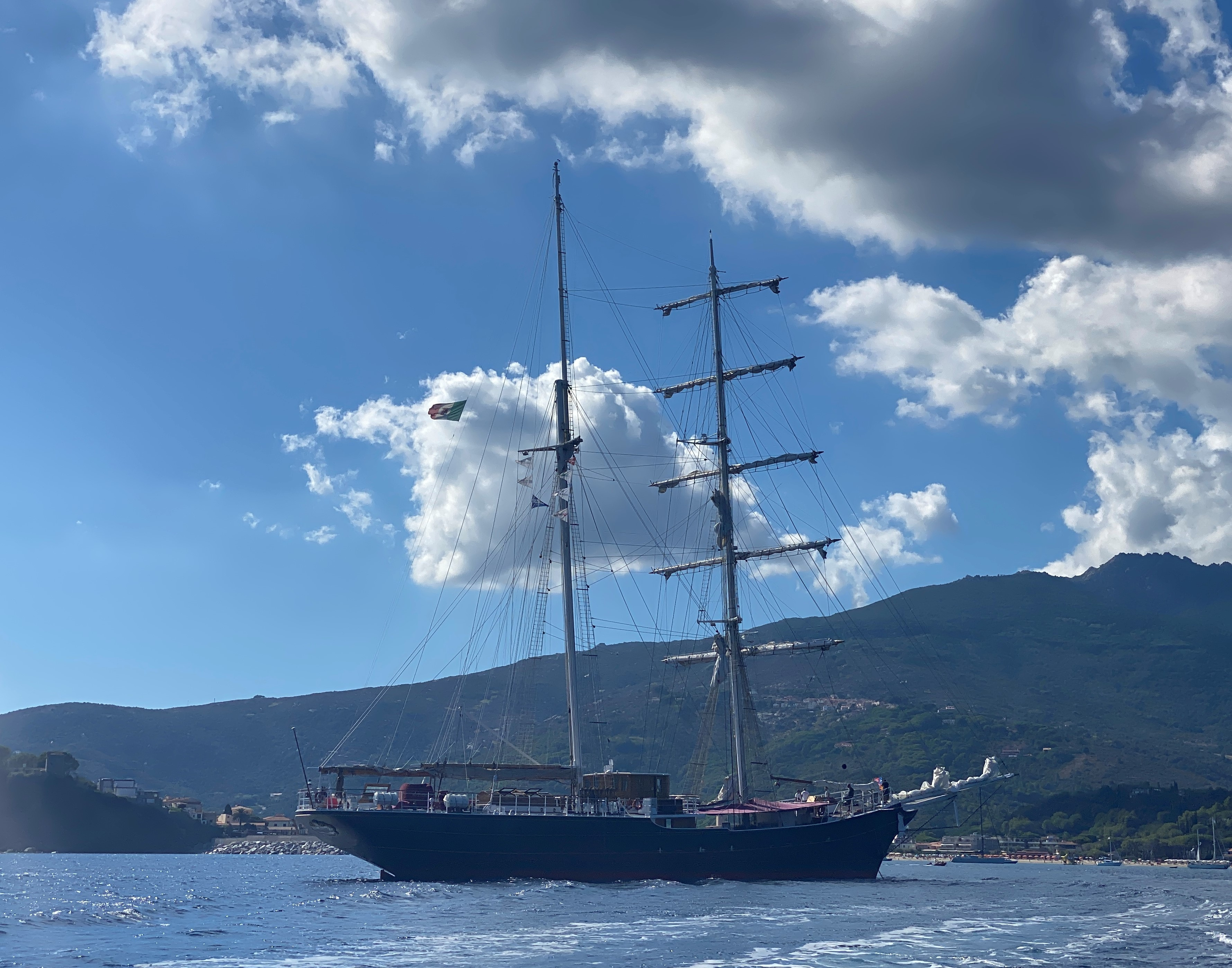
