= Catania Metro =

Rapid transit system serving Catania, Sicily, Italy

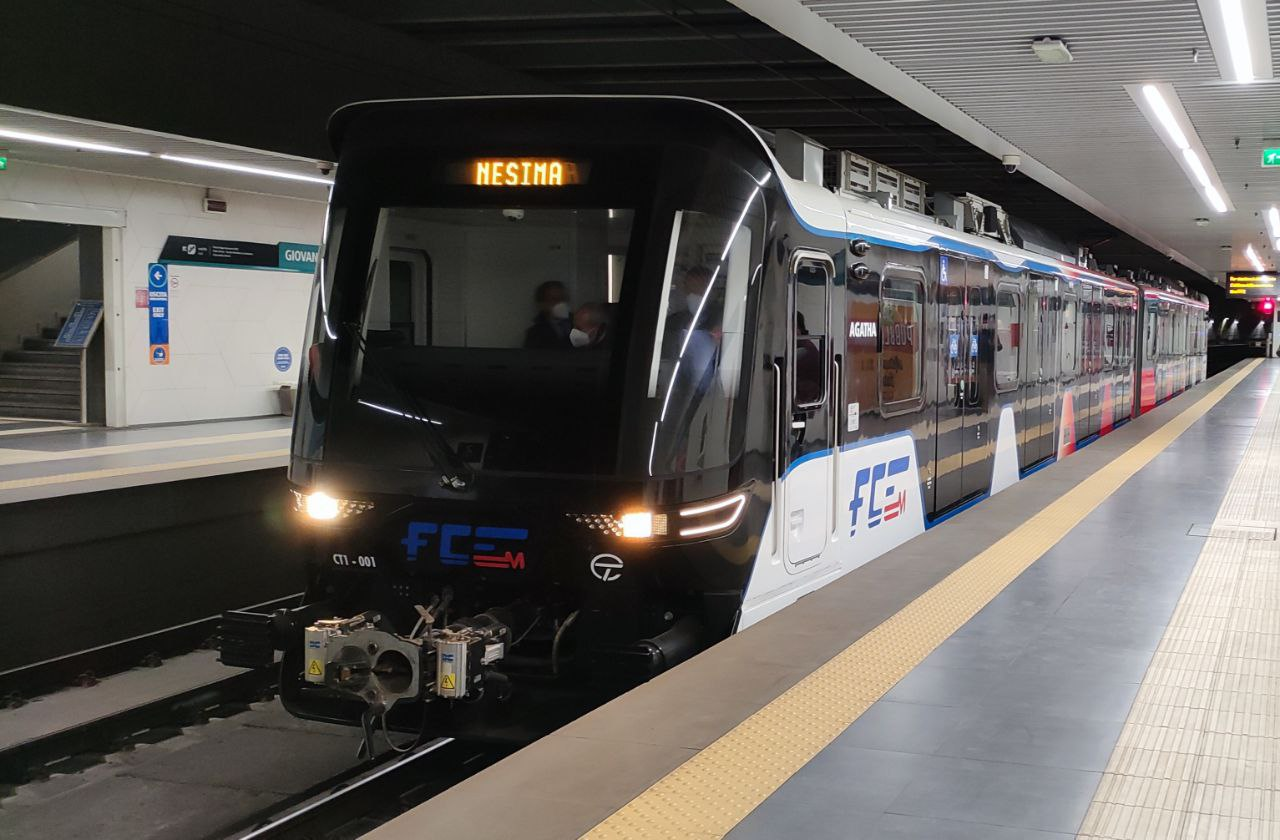
- Catania Metro train at Giovanni XXIII Station

Overview
- Locale: Catania, Sicily, Italy
- Transit type: Rapid transit
- Number of lines: 1
- Number of stations: 12
- Annual ridership: 6,500,000 (2019)
- Website: www.circumetnea.it

Operation
- Began operation: 27 June 1999; 27 years ago
- Operator: Ferrovia Circumetnea
- Number of vehicles: 8 FCE M.88; 10 FCE CT0

Technical
- System length: 10.5 km (6.5 mi)
- Track gauge: 1,435 mm (4 ft 8 1/2 in) standard gauge
- Electrification: 3 kV DC overhead line
System map

The Catania Metro (Italian: Metropolitana di Catania) is a rapid transit system serving the coastal city of Catania, Sicily, in Southern Italy. One of Italy’s seven metro systems, it is the only one in Sicily. It was also the first metro on an island in the Mediterranean Sea, and is now one of two, with the Palma Metro becoming the second in 2007, although it was only the sixth in a city on the Mediterranean, after Athens (1904), Barcelona (1924), Marseille (1977), Valencia (1988) and Naples (1993).

The Catania Metro has been in operation since 27 June 1999.

== History and construction ==
The section of the line between the stations of Borgo and Porto originally belonged to the Ferrovia Circumetnea narrow-gauge regional railway which opened to traffic in 1895.

For the operation of the metro, this portion of the rail line was converted to standard gauge and mostly moved underground into a double-track 2.0 kilometres (1.2 mi) cut-and-cover tunnel, except for the part of the route adjacent to the coast which runs on the surface for 1.8 kilometres (1.1 mi) and which is single-tracked. Thus, the narrow-gauge Circumetnea railway's original terminus at Catania Porto had to be moved to Borgo due to the development of the Catania Metro.

The Metropolitana and the Circumetnea railways are operated by the same company, which has its offices at Catania Borgo.

== Current service ==
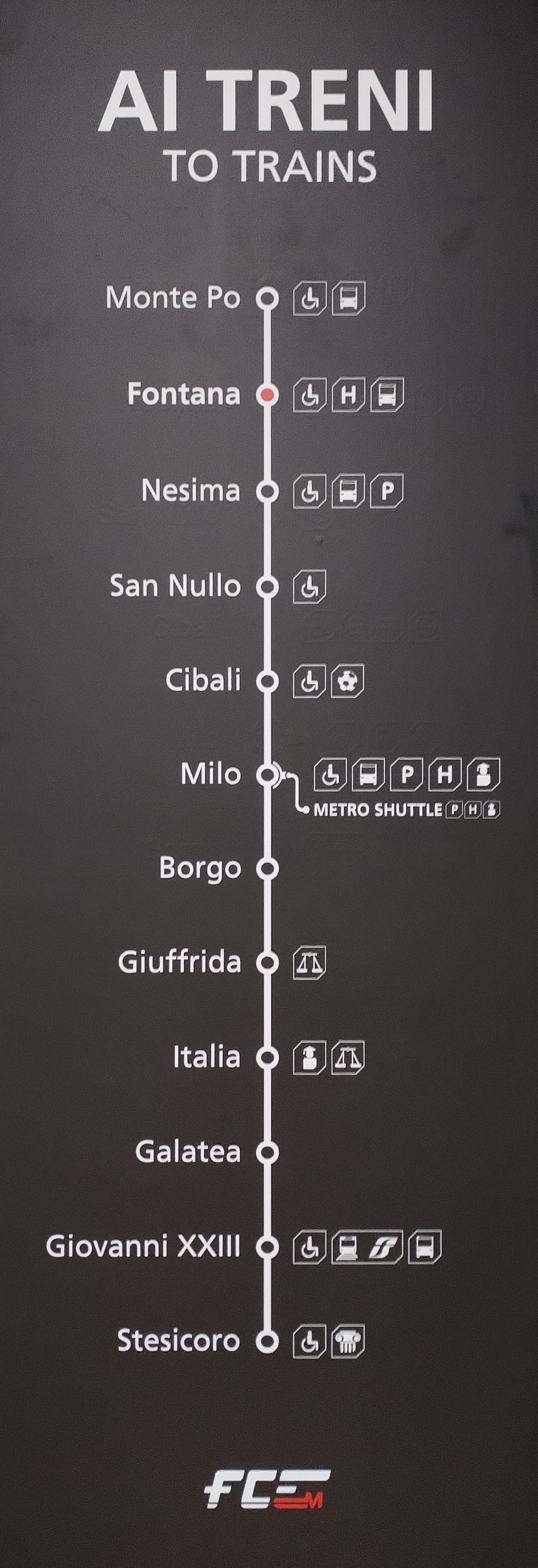
Route map used inside the stations

Station	Year of opening	interchange	Current state
Monte Po	2024		in service
Fontana	2024		in service
Nesima	2017		in service
San Nullo	2017		in service
Cibali	2021		in service
Milo	2017	Metro Shuttle	in service
Borgo	1999		in service
Giuffrida	1999		in service
Italia	1999		in service
Galatea	1999		in service
Ramo porto
FS	1898	Catania Centrale	closed
Porto	1898		closed
Ramo aeroporto
Giovanni XXIII	2016	Catania Centrale	in service
Stesicoro	2016		in service
San Domenico			under construction
Vittorio Emanuele			under construction
Palestro			under construction

During the first years of operation, this metro suffered from poor ridership, as its former route (from 1999 to 2016) merely skirted the city centre and therefore did not reach many popular destinations. However, ridership increased significantly in 2017. The metro usually operates every day. Trains run every 10 minutes until 3:00 p.m. and then every 15 minutes until the end of the service, at 10 p.m.

=== Tickets ===
All tickets (except MetroBus tickets) may be purchased at ticket machines at every station.

- 90min: €1
- DayTicket: €2
- MetroBus Ticket: €1.20
- 30days Ticket: €15

== Future service and planned extensions ==
Map of proposed Catania Metro expansion

An extension to the system was approved on 30 March 2006. It involves a branch from the existing line at Galatea westward through the city centre, which is planned eventually to reach Catania's Fontanarossa airport to the south. This solution was favored over proposals for an airport link by means of a new station on the Catania-Siracusa line, which runs past the airport and is part of the national rail network. Recent underground stations at Piazza Papa Giovanni XXIII and Corso Sicilia, near Piazza Stesicoro among others, have served the city center since 20 December 2016. The track Borgo-Nesima (four new stations) opened in March 2017 and Nesima-Monte Po (two new stations) in July 2024.

Another extension, westward from the current terminal at Monte Po, is also under construction towards Paternò. It is planned to open in 2027.

== Rolling stock ==
Elettrotreno FCE M.88
- In service: 2001–present
- Manufacturer: Firema Trasporti S.p.A.
- Constructed: 1998–2011
- Number under construction: 14 two-car trains
- Number built: 8
- Formation: 2-car permanently coupled sets
- Capacity: 442

Specifications
- Car body construction: aluminum
- Doors: 8 sets per car
- Electric system: 3000 V DC overhead pantograph

Like mainline trains in Italy but unusual for a metro, trains use 3000 V DC overhead wires for power, the exact reason for doing so being unknown. It is the only metro outside Brazil to use 3000 V DC overhead power, and only of only two metros worldwide to use 3000 V DC power on standard gauge tracks, the other being the Salvador Metro in Brazil. Belo Horizonte and Porto Alegre use the same voltage too, but on 5 ft 3 in (1,600 mm) Irish gauge tracks.

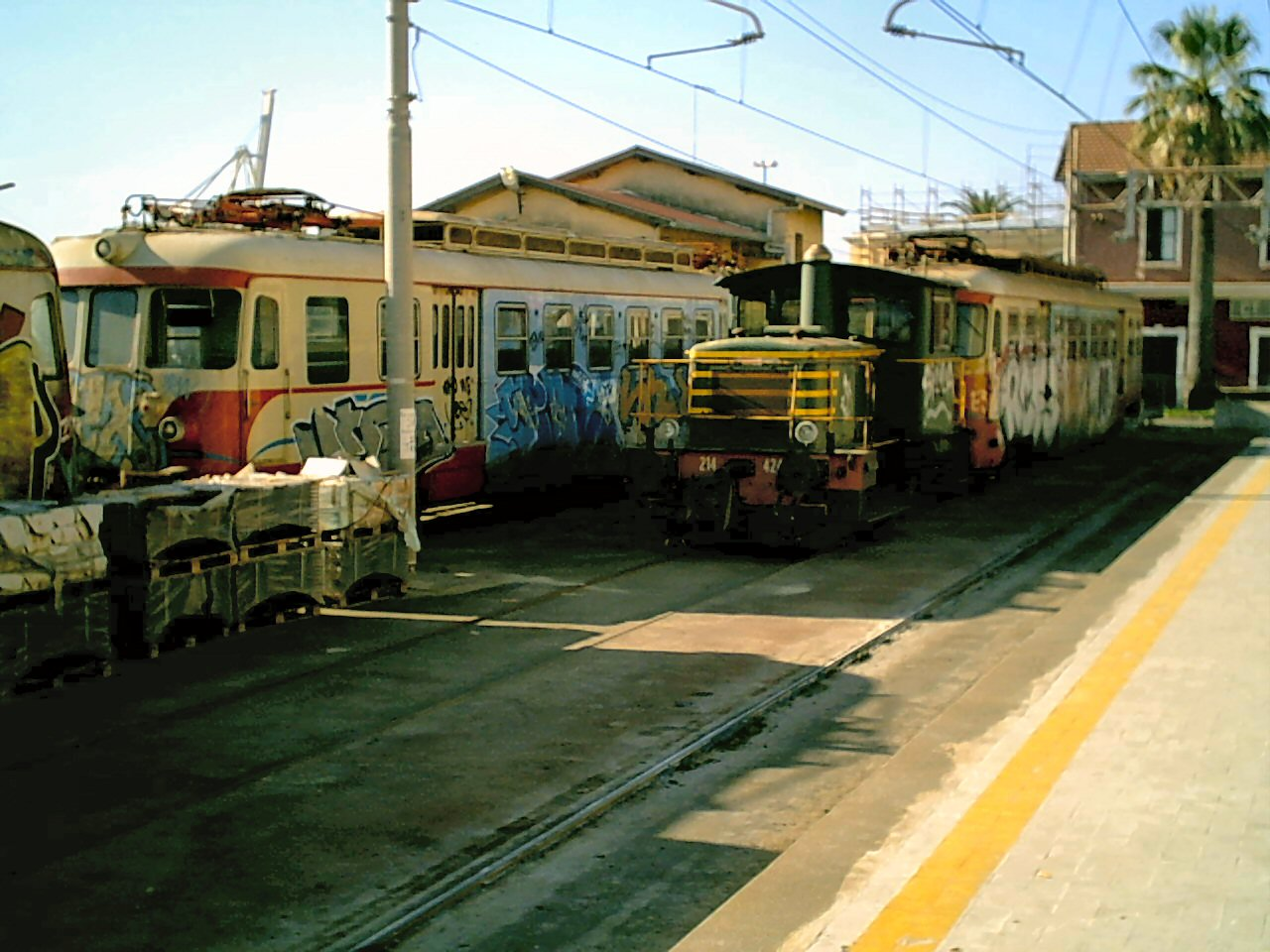
The electric railcars E.101, 102 and 103.

E100 Series (E101-E103, 3 units) - Stanga-TIBB electric single-units railcars bought-second hand from the Ferrovia Centrale Umbra. Used as temporary rolling stock between 1999 and 2001.

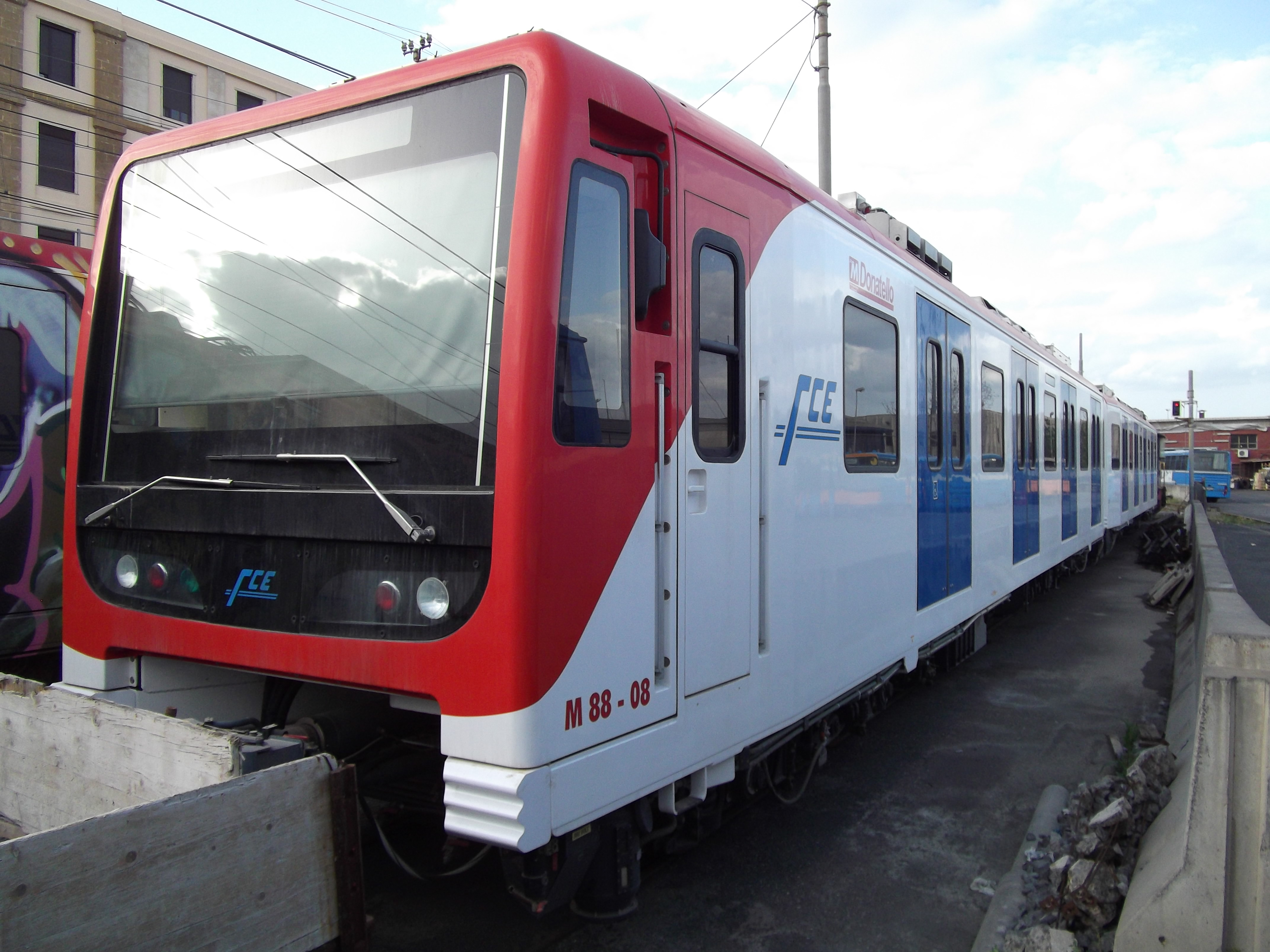
The electric train M.88-08 (series M.88.01-08).

M.88 Series (M.88-01 to M.88-08, 8 two-car sets) - Two-car electric multiple units built by Firema between 2001 and 2011. Mainstay of the line since 2001. Originally, each of them had a name.

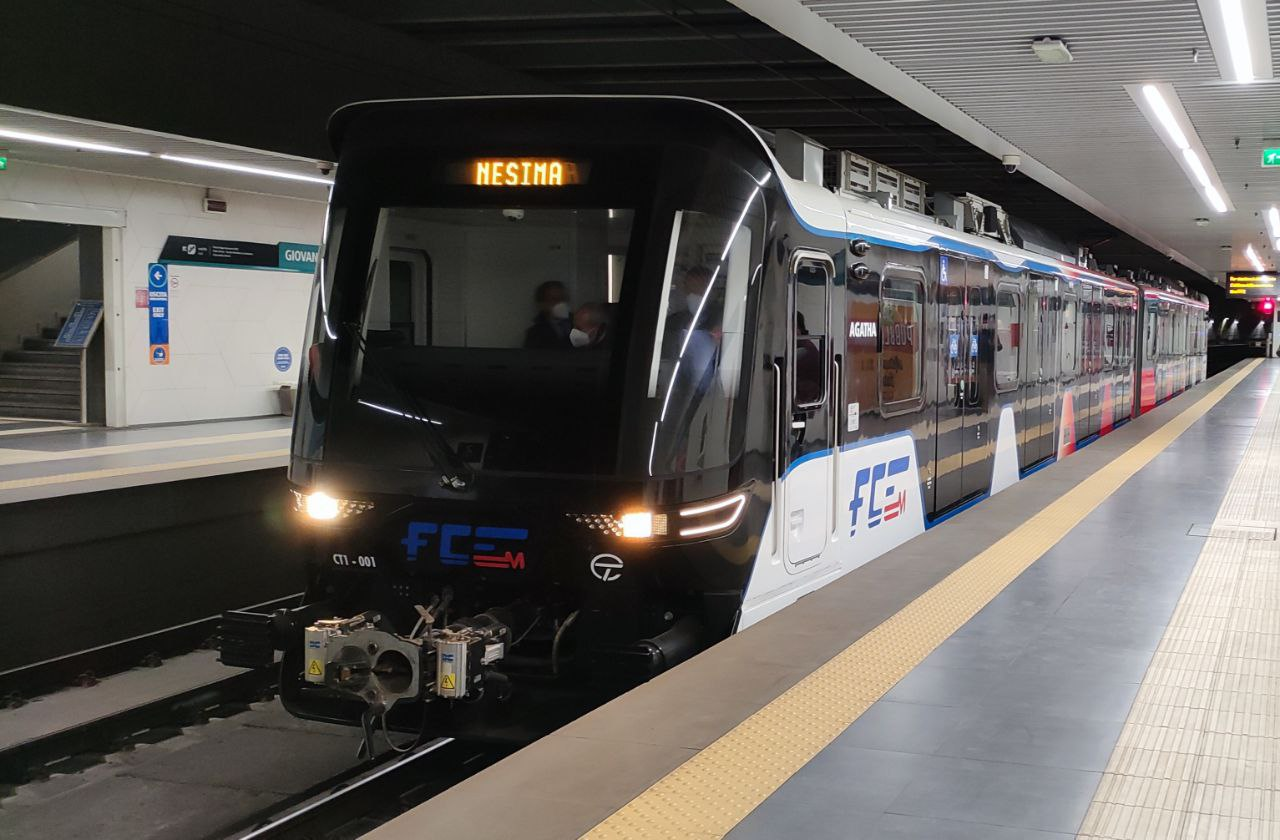
The electric train CT1.CT2-001 (series CT0).

CT1 Series (10 two-car sets in service) - Two-car electric multiple units built by Titagarh-Firema. A total of 27 two-car units have been ordered in 2018. First train in service since 1 April 2022.

== See also ==
- Ferrovia Circumetnea
- Lists of rapid transit systems
