= Ferrovia Circumetnea =

Italian railway

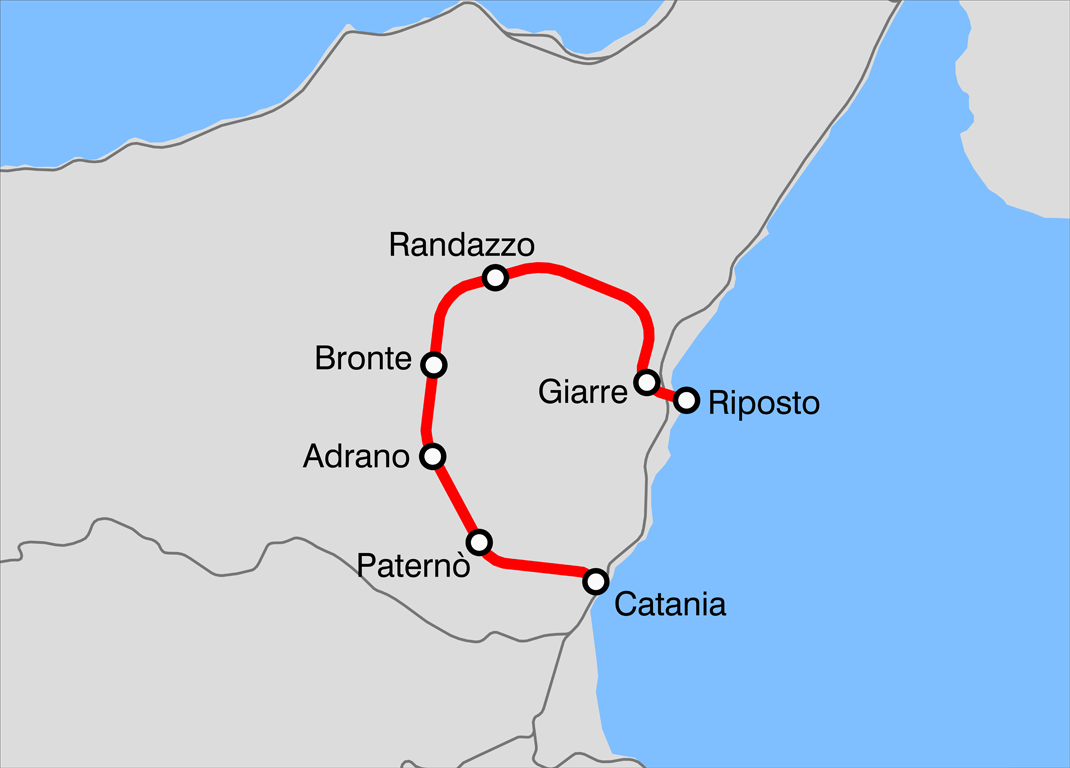
The Circumetnea line around Mount Etna

The Ferrovia Circumetnea (roughly translated as "Round-Etna Railway") is a narrow-gauge, 950 mm (3 ft 1 3/8 in), regional railway line in Sicily. It was constructed between 1895 and 1898.

As the name suggests, the 110-kilometre (68-mile) line follows a route which almost completely encircles the Mount Etna volcano. From its terminal in Catania the line starts off westward and loops around Mount Etna in a clockwise direction (as seen on the map), eventually reaching the other terminal at the seaside town of Riposto, approximately 28 kilometres (17 miles) northeast of Catania.

The original terminal was at Catania Porto, although Catania Central (the mainline station) was the last stop for the trains. However, in the 1990s the section from there to Catania Borgo (4 kilometres (2.5 miles) long) was converted to standard gauge and moved underground for most of its length for use as a new metro (Metropolitana di Catania). The original terminus, the Porto station, was also reinstated. Therefore, the Circumetnea trains now terminate at Catania Borgo.

The Ferrovia Circumetnea (FCE) also operates the Metropolitana. The offices for both are at Catania Borgo.

FCE operates The DMU 001-004, multiple units diesel of construction Newag. They were in service with four more on order as of late 2017. On 15 June 2024, the movement of trains on the Catania Borgo - Paternò route was suspended because of the upgrade works for the extension of the Metropolitana di Catania, with associated change of gauge, until Paternò. The railway services are replaced with bus services which will travel the almost parallel road route on the SS121, entering the towns at the stops to be served.

As of 2026, trains run from Santa Maria di Licodia Sud to Randazzo, while a bus service replaces the line from Nesima to Licodia.

== Gallery ==
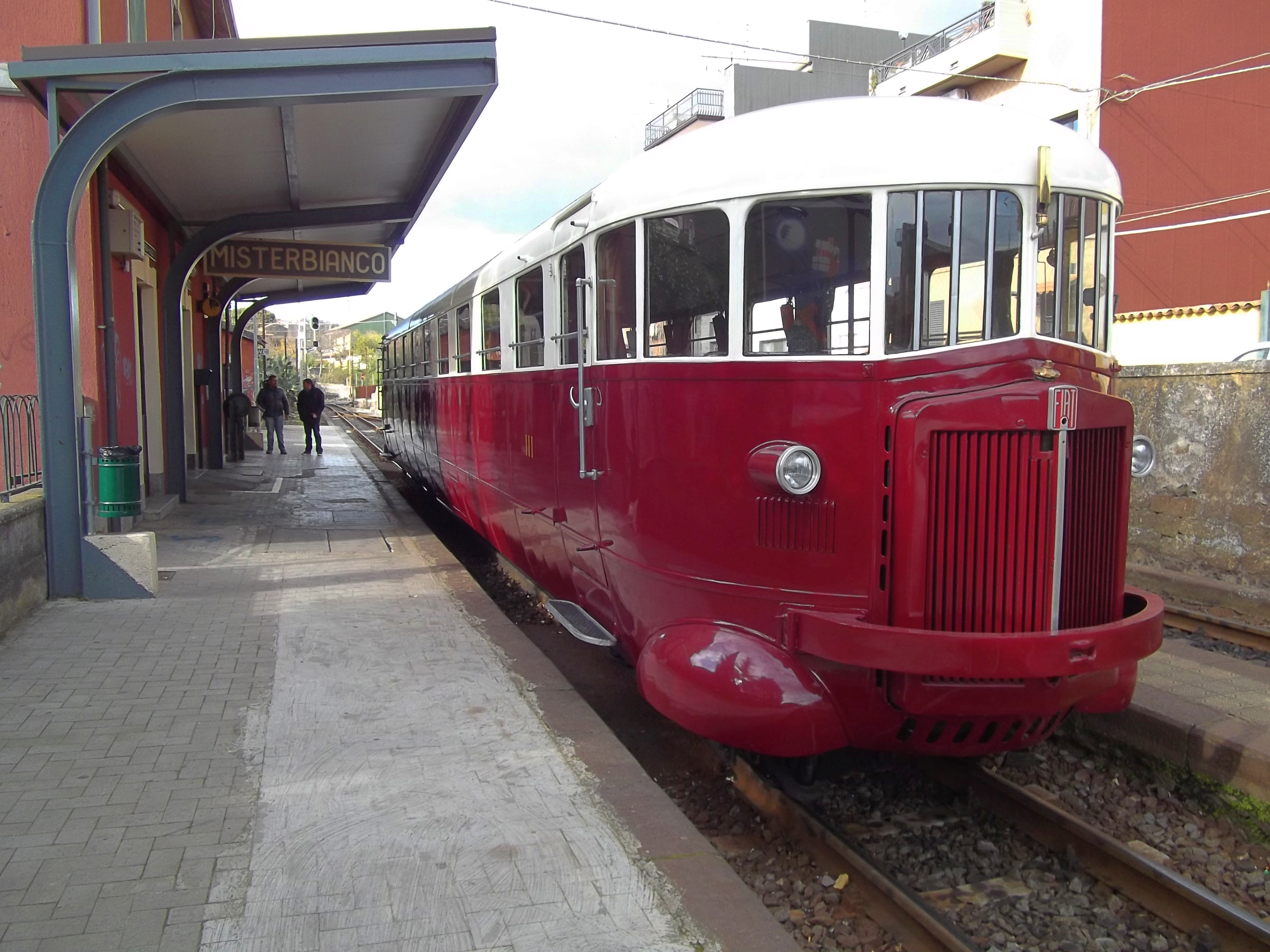
The "Littorina" ALn 56.06, parked at the FCE Misterbianco station.

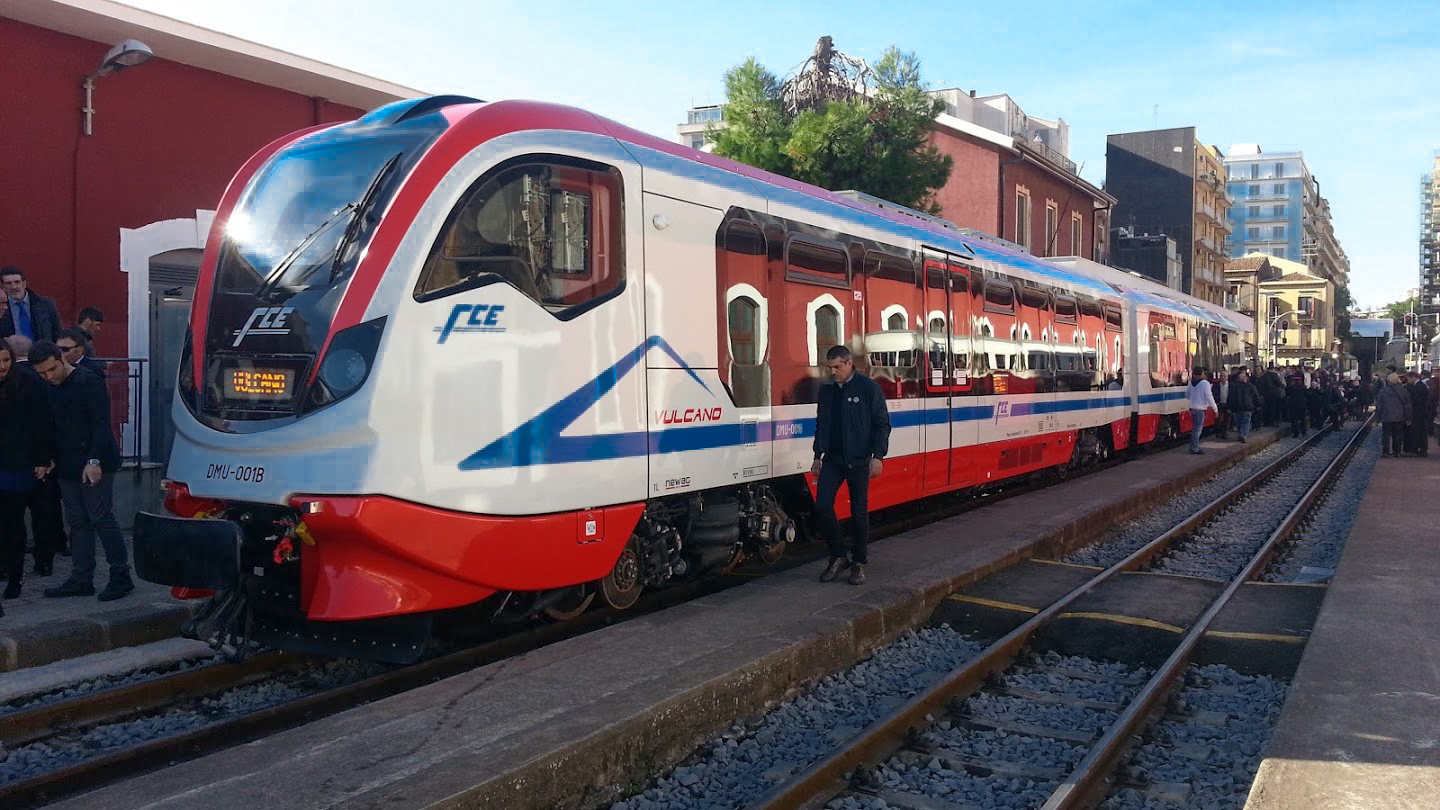
The DMU 001 "Vulcano" train at Catania Borgo, in December 2015.

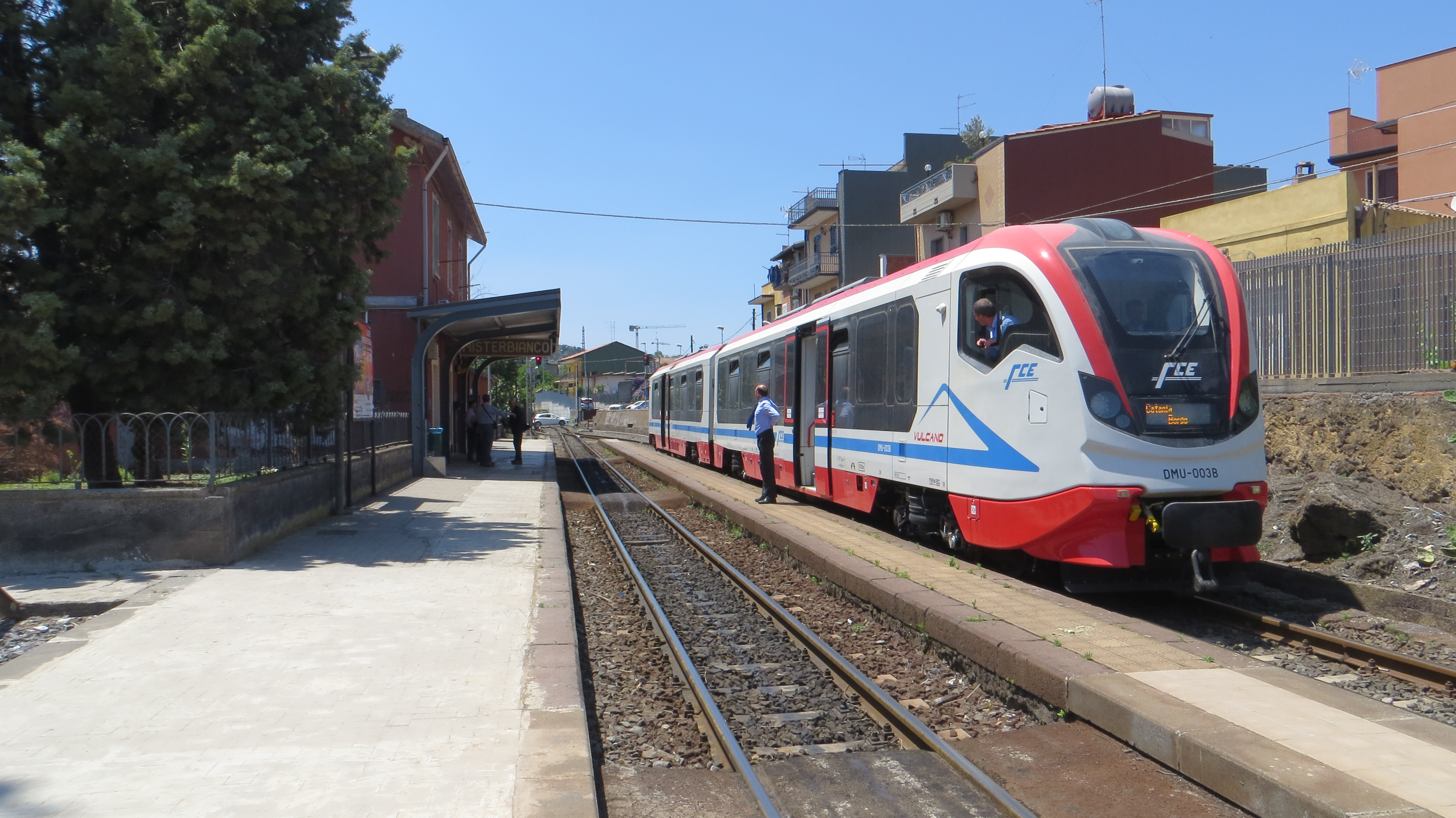
The DMU 003 "Vulcano", at the FCE Misterbianco station.

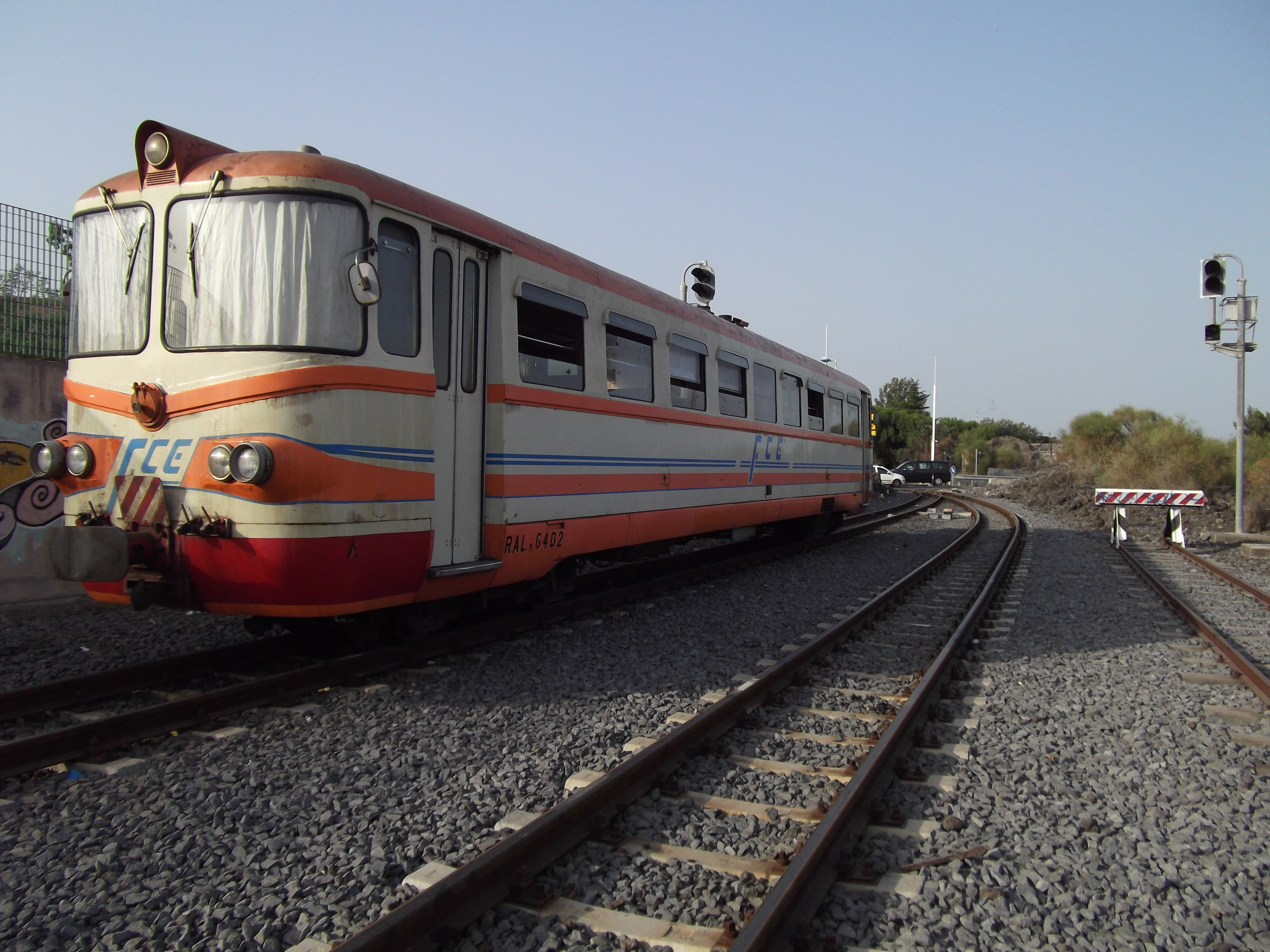
The RALn 6402 packed at the FCE Nesima station.

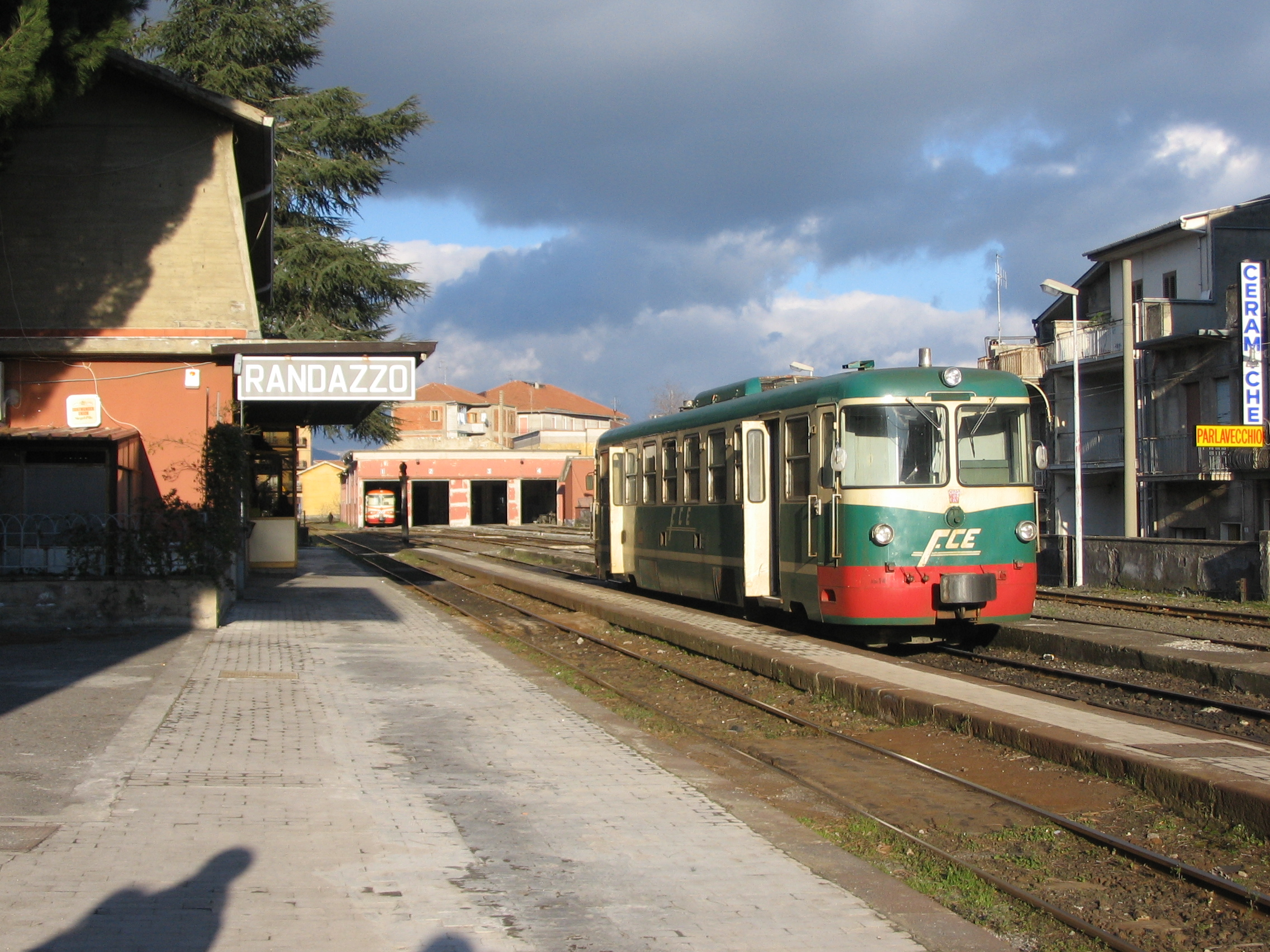
Ferrovia Circumetnea, Randazzo station.

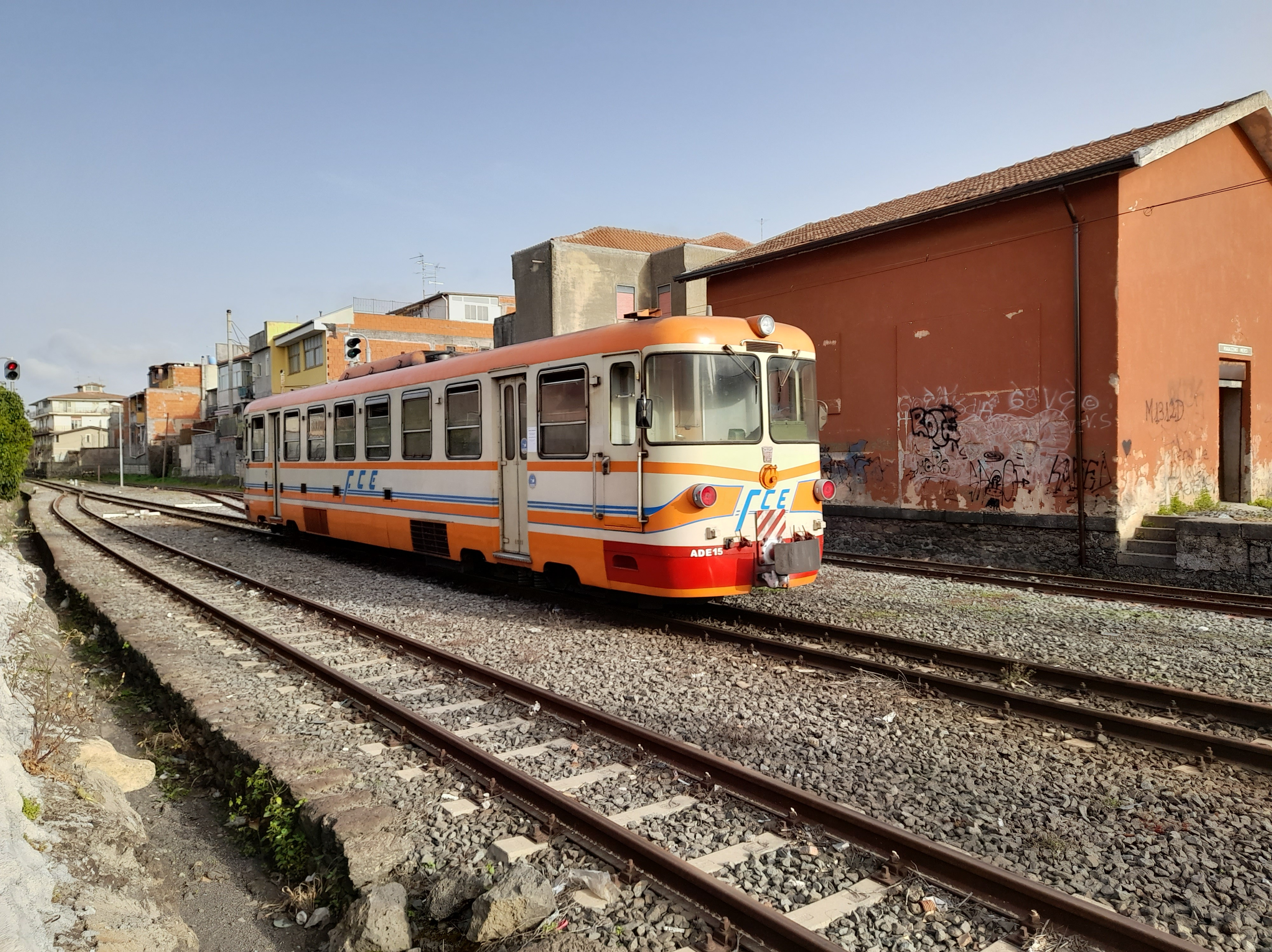
The ADe 15 in transit at the FCE Misterbianco station.

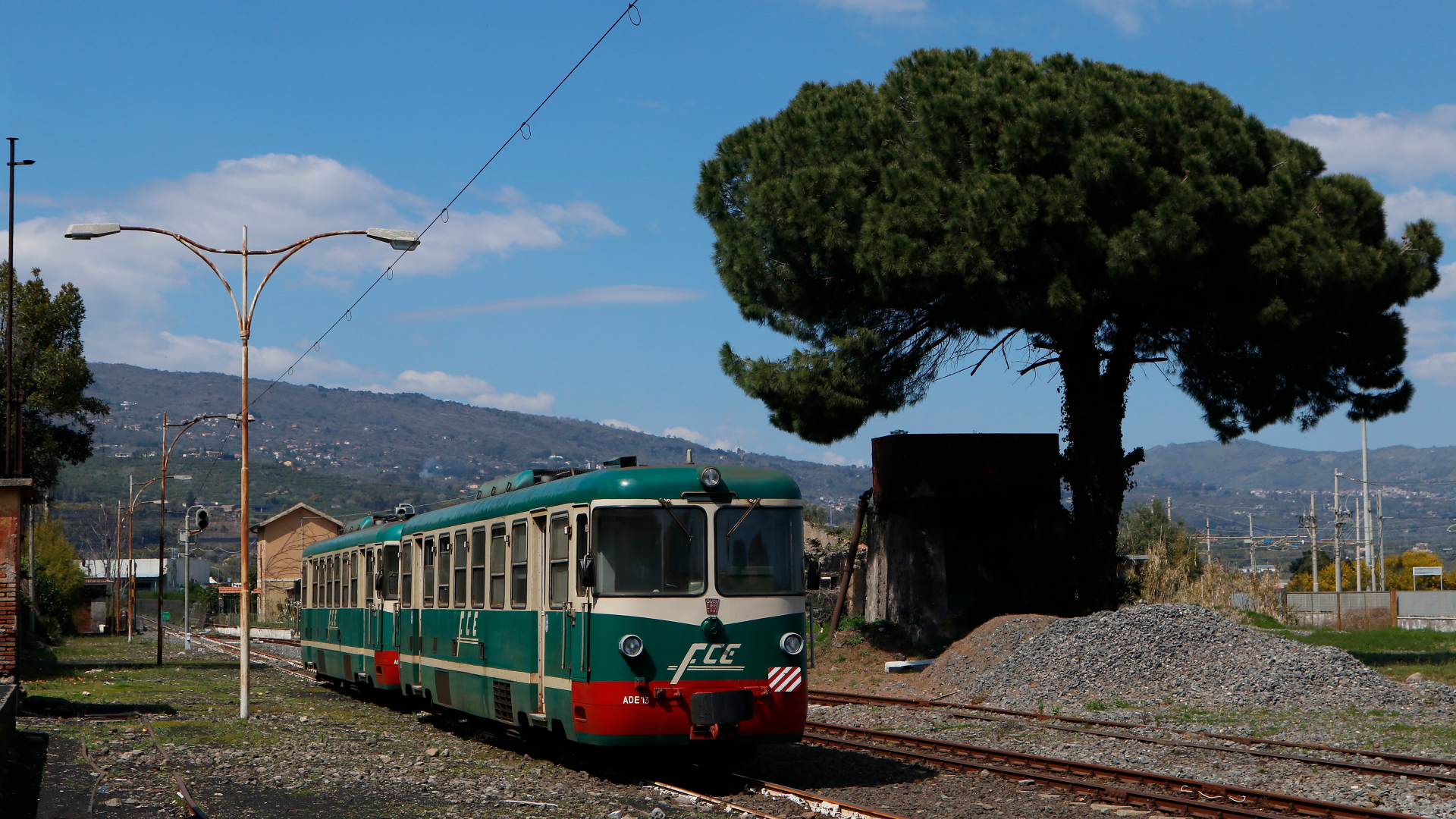
The ADe 14 and 13 leaving Giarre to Randazzo.

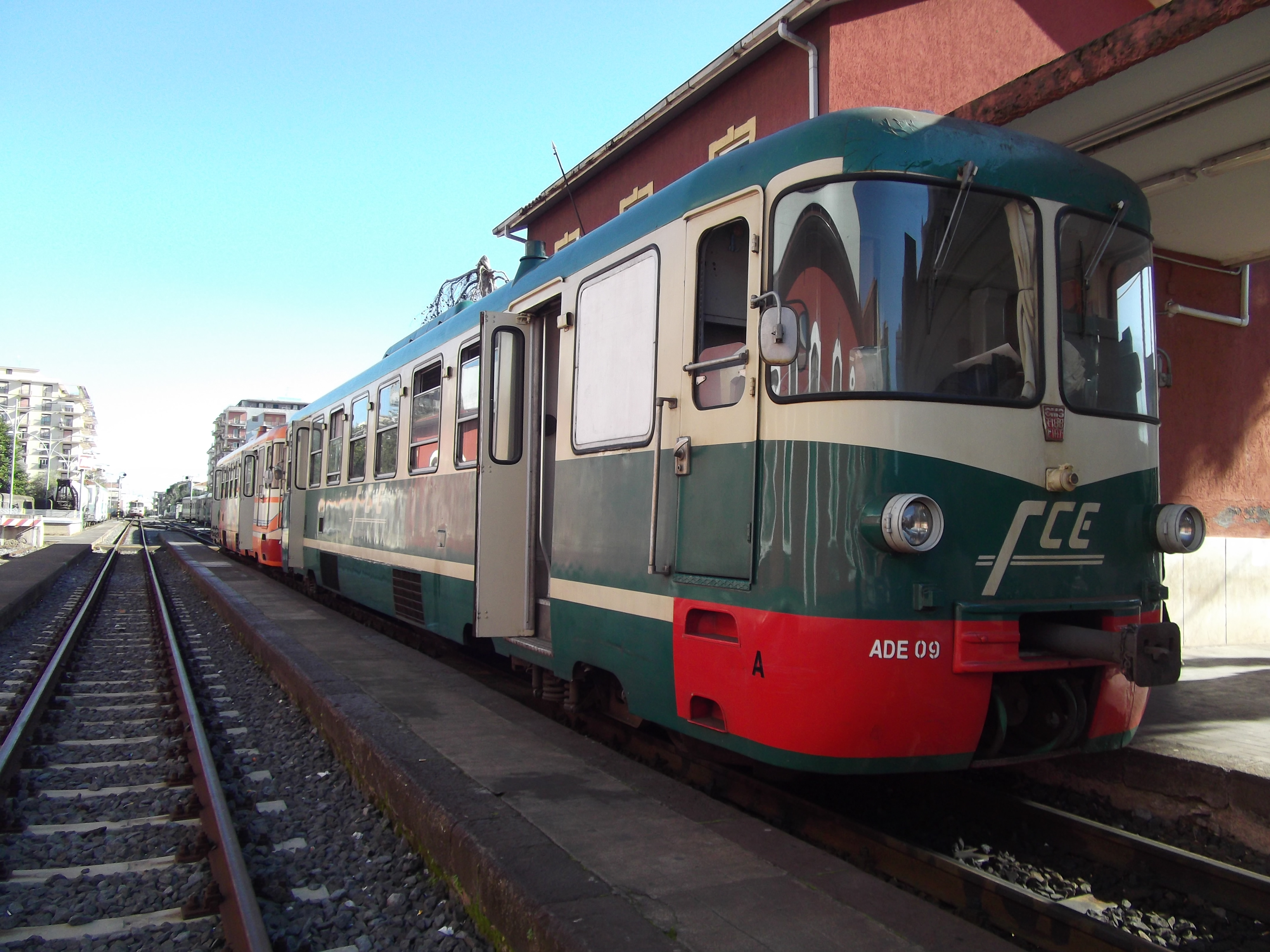
The ADe 09 and 08 at the FCE Catania Borgo station.

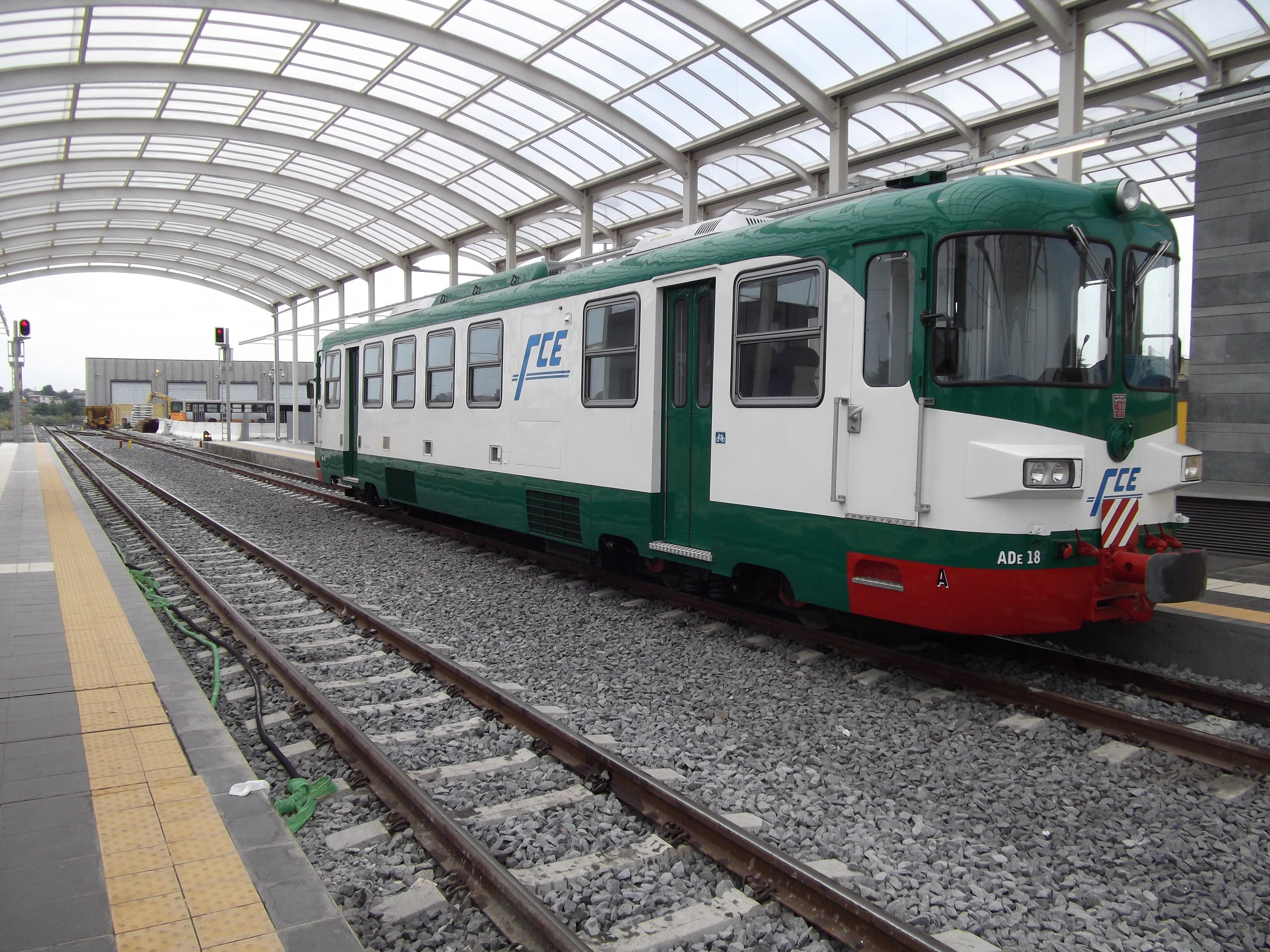
The ADe 18, named "La Prima" on occasion of its revamping, parked at the FCE Adrano Nord station.

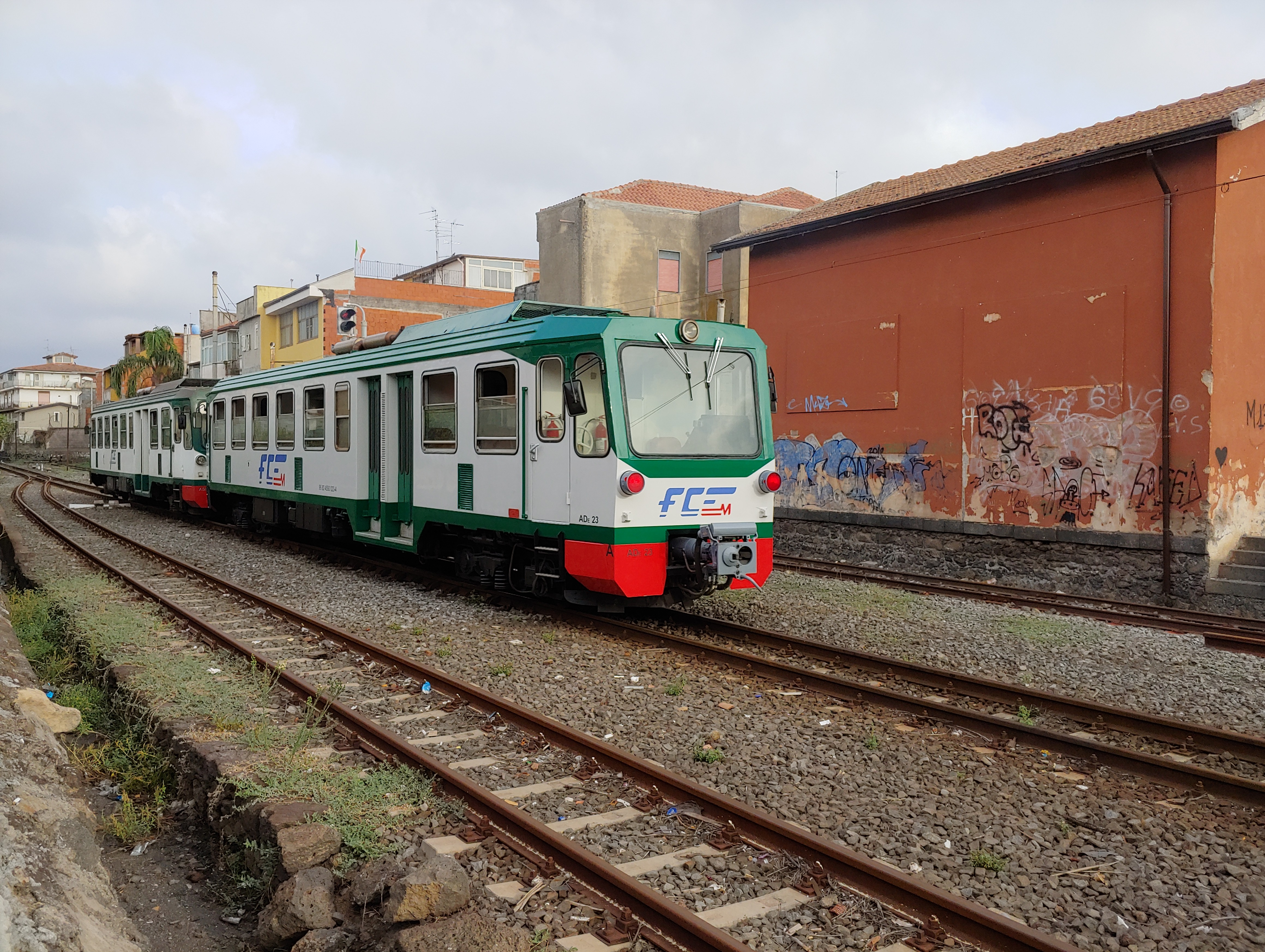
The ADe 24 and 23 in the new livery, in transit at the FCE Misterbianco station.

== See also ==
- Railway network of Sicily
