= FS Class ALn 668 =

Italian diesel railcar type

FS ALn 668
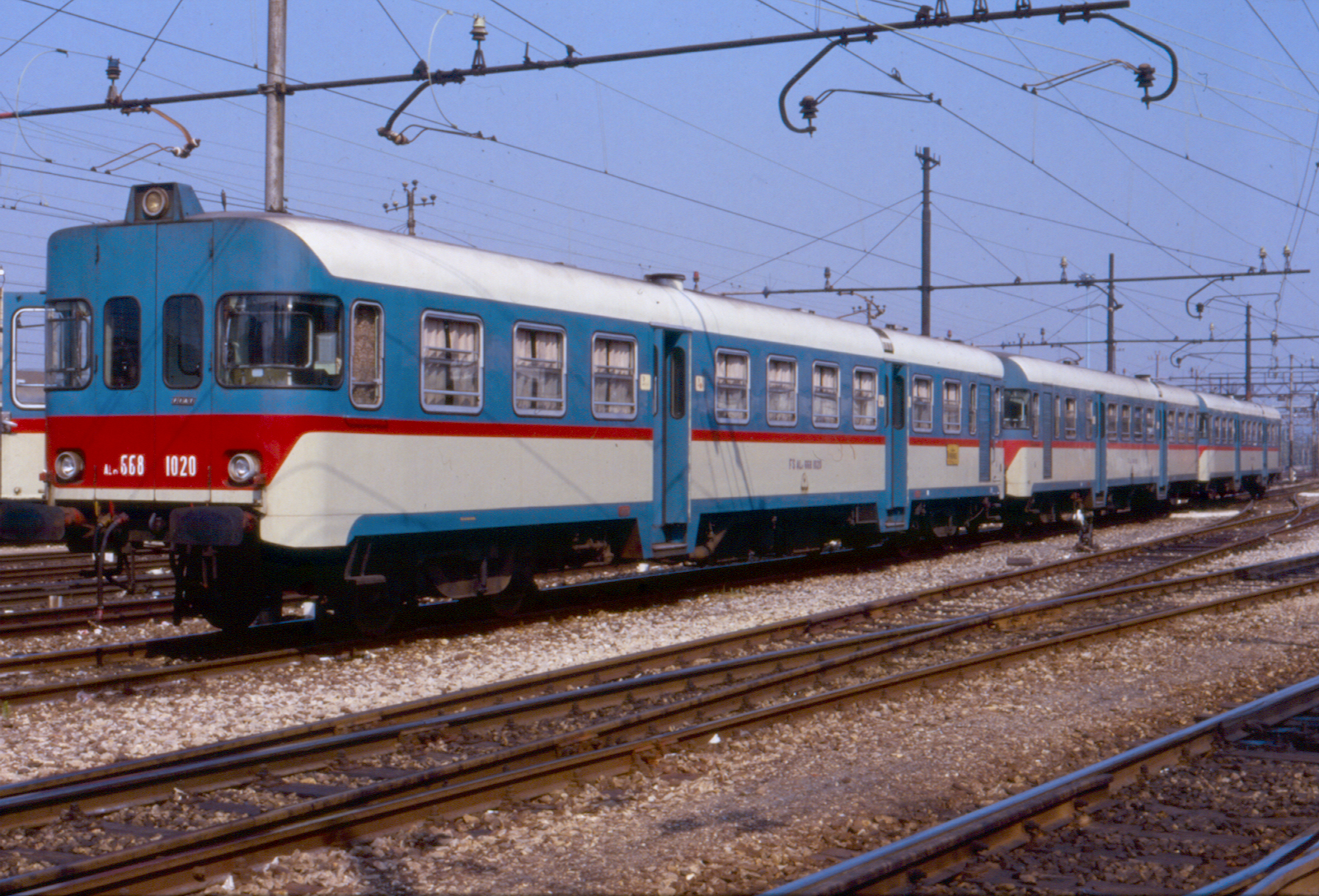
- ALn 668.1020 in August 1985
- Manufacturers: Fiat Ferroviaria, Breda, Omeca
- Constructed: 1956–1983
- Entered service: December 1956
- Number built: 785
- Capacity: 68 seated
- Operator: Ferrovie dello Stato

Specifications
- Car length: 22,110 mm (72 ft 6 in)
- Maximum speed: 130 km/h (81 mph)
- Weight: 36 tonnes
- Track gauge: 1,435 mm (4 ft 8 1/2 in) standard gauge

The ALn 668 (Automotrice Leggera a nafta, Light Diesel motor car) series is a family of diesel railcars built by Fiat Ferroviaria between the year 50s and 1980s. The trains were built for the Italian public railway company Ferrovie dello Stato (FS), now Trenitalia as well as many Italian private railway operators. Types derived from the class have been built for the railway companies of other nations. Most of the trains are still in service today.

The forty units of the 2400 series were built entirely by Breda in Milan, Italy

The ALn 668 is considered the standard railcar of the FS. Class ALn 663 is quite similar, while maintaining the same mechanics, received a different classification exclusively for the new interior design that reduced the number from sixty-eight to sixty-three.

== Background ==
Much of FS's fleet was destroyed at the end of World War II, which meant the company needed a replacement diesel railcar. The essential characteristic of the new rolling stock was the provision of the drive motor under the floor, so as to leave the maximum space available for passengers.

The railcars RALn 60, built for the modernization of passenger service on the lines of the Sicilian FS 950 mm (3 ft 1 3/8 in) Narrow gauge railways were tested from January 1950 and were the start of the long line of railcars built by Fiat from the war until the first half of the nineties.

Although the behavior of new railcars was overall satisfactory, availability and maintenance costs were still very far from the objectives considered within the Service Material and Traction for FS, which had long aspired to the creation of an Italian railcar standard.

By building on the experience already acquired in 1954, the FS initiated the project for a new standard railcar, for which the FS established clearly the fundamental objectives: high reliability, ease of conduct and learning, maintenance and repair well-programmable, overall costs contained defined and relatively modest, given the kind of services that diesel railcars were called upon to play in a network where it had planned the electrification of all main lines.

The only binding conditions imposed on the builders were that the railcar was twin engine, that the mass adherent was not lower than 50% of the total, the engines were placed under the floor and which exceeded the test UIC 100 hours.

The manufacturers of railway equipment able to meet the demand of the Service Material and Traction were at the time Breda, OM and FIAT. Breda, committed to the realization of railcars TEE answered only in 1959; OM, intent to reissue the ALn 772 and preparing ALn 773 defected the offer, but was later involved in the construction of the FIAT trailers and foreign versions of ' ALn 668; FIAT, although busy with various productions (including ALn 64 per rack for the Paola-Cosenza line) quickly responded to the call of FS, also because with its industrial potential was the only company able to operate without constraints due to licenses. Added to this advantage FIAT added the ability to use diesel engines derived from production in large series of trucks, a choice that proved decisive for the future success of ALn 668 resulting in a considerable saving in initial cost, ensuring maximum reliability and an efficient care service with high availability of spare parts.

== Variants ==
- ALn 668.1400 (80 built between 1954 and 1963)
- ALn 668.2400 (40 built between 1959 and 1964)
- ALn 668.1500 (75 built between 1965 and 1967)
- ALn 668.1600 (33 built between 1970 and 1971)
- ALn 668.1700 (20 built between 1971 and 1972)
- ALn 668.1800 (85 built between 1971 and 1973)
- ALn 668.1900 (42 built between 1975 and 1976)
- ALn 668.1000 (120 built between 1976 and 1979)
- ALn 668.1200 (60 built between 1979 and 1980)
- ALn 668.3000 (40 built between 1980 and 1981)
- ALn 668.3100 (150 built between 1980 and 1983)
- ALn 668.3300 (40 built between 1982 and 1983)
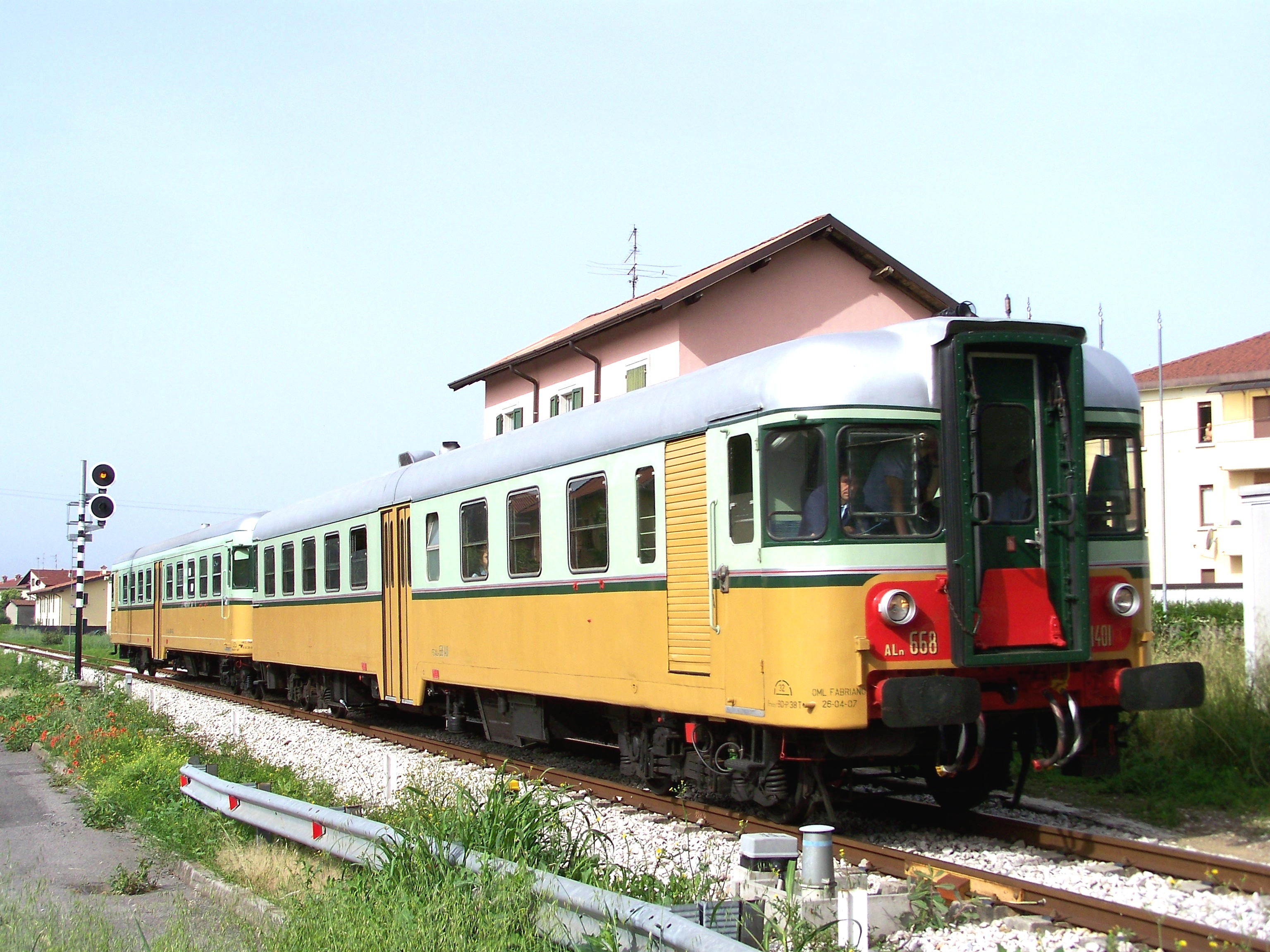
ALn 668.1400

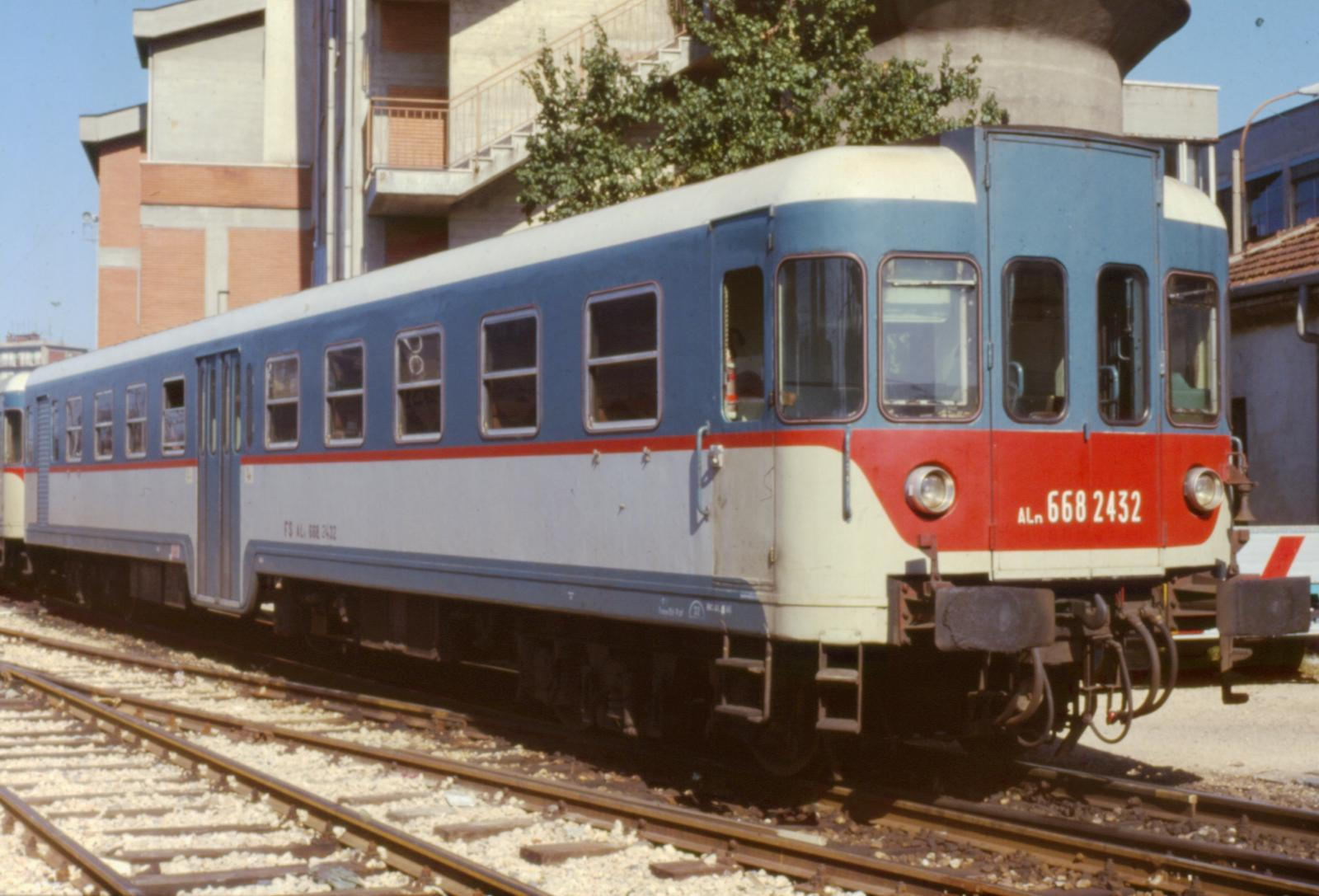
ALn 668.2400

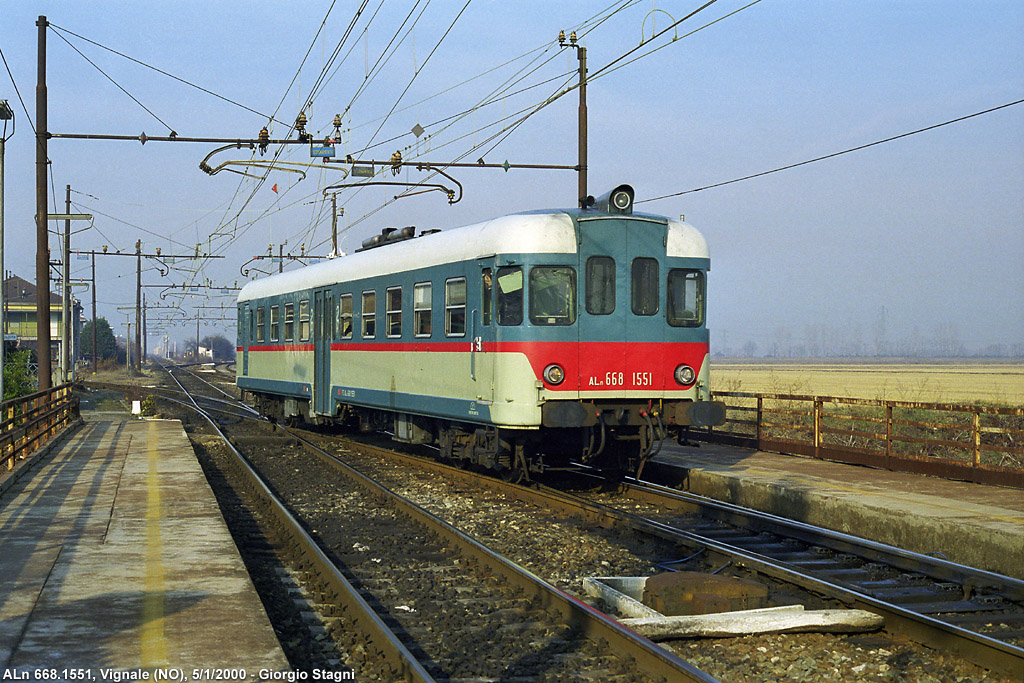
ALn 668.1500

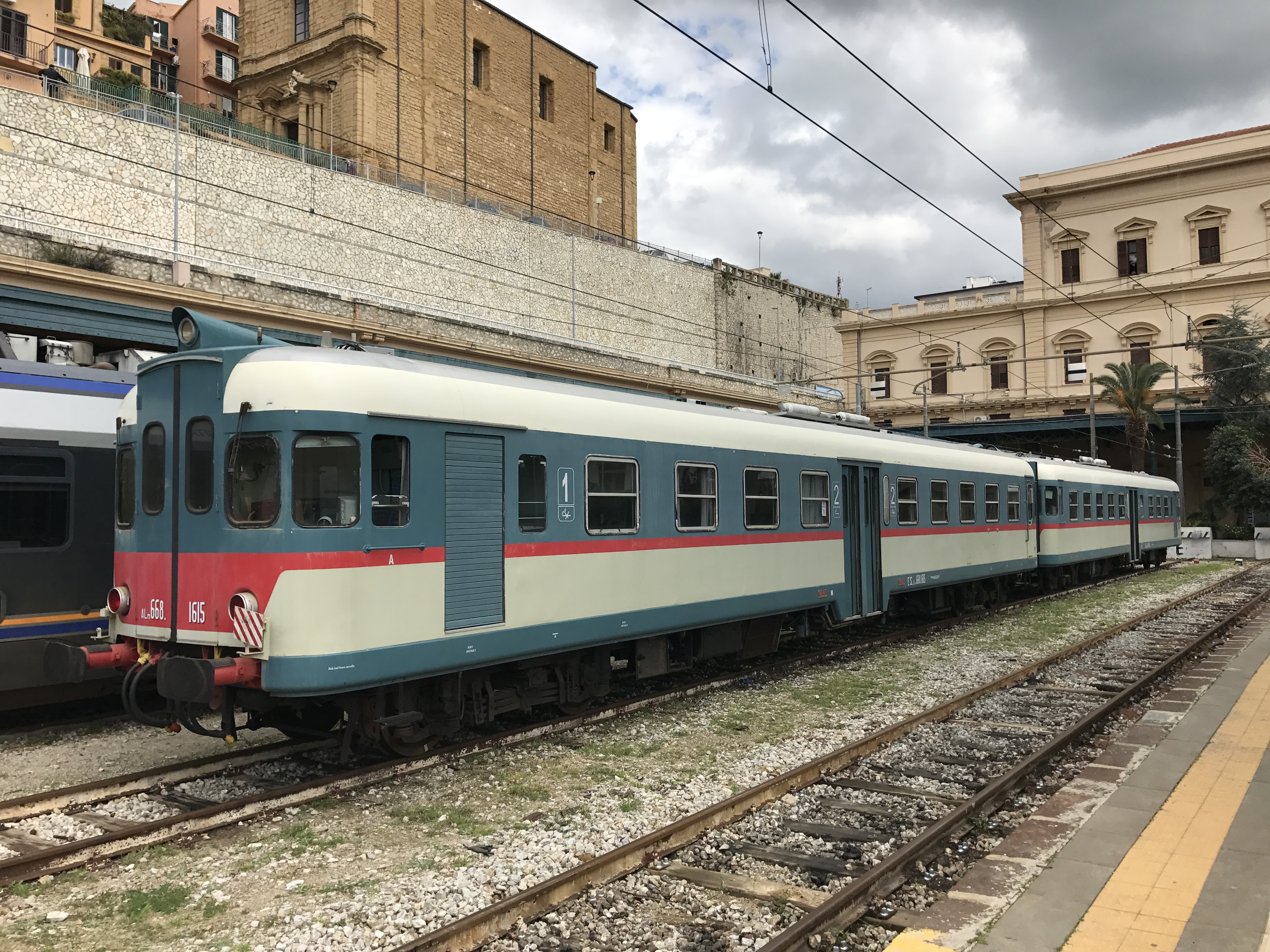
ALn 668.1600

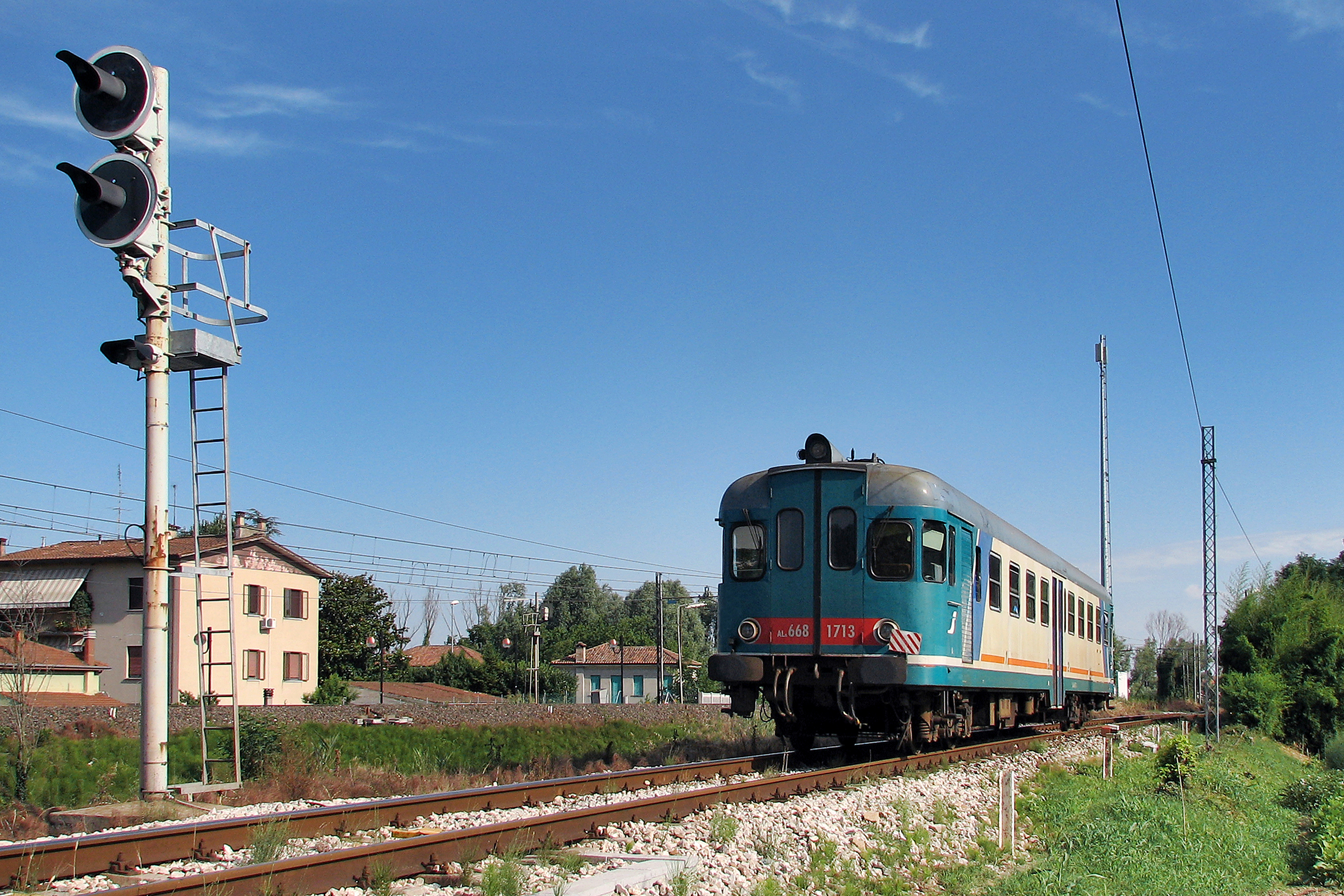
ALn 668.1700

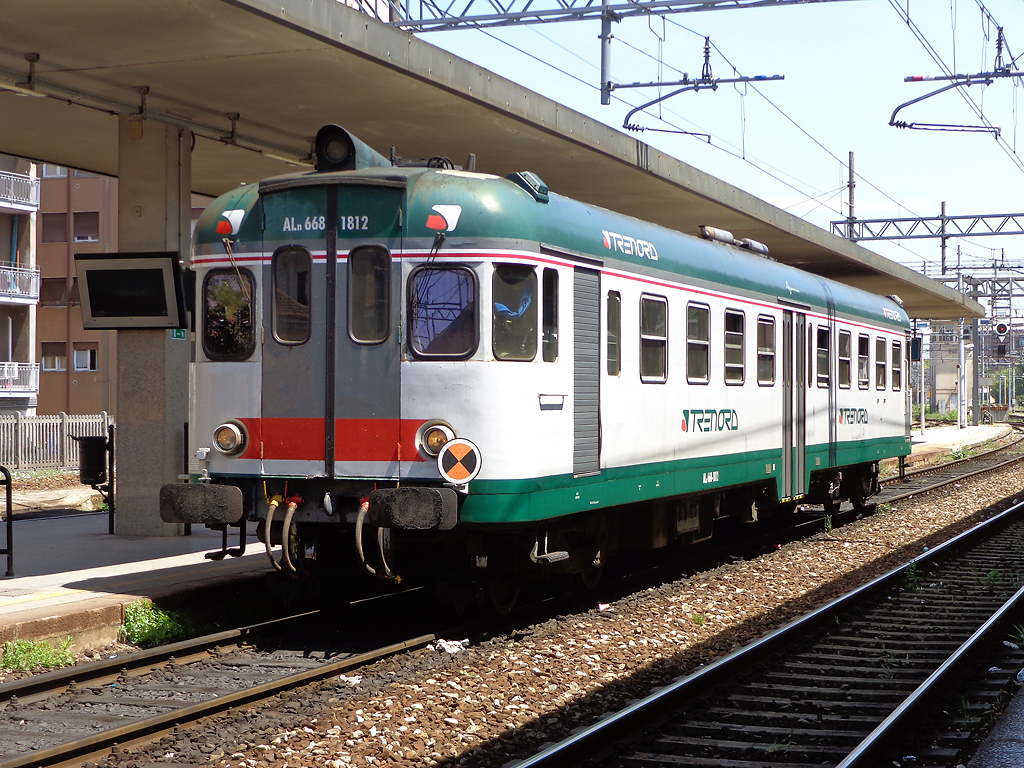
ALn 668.1800

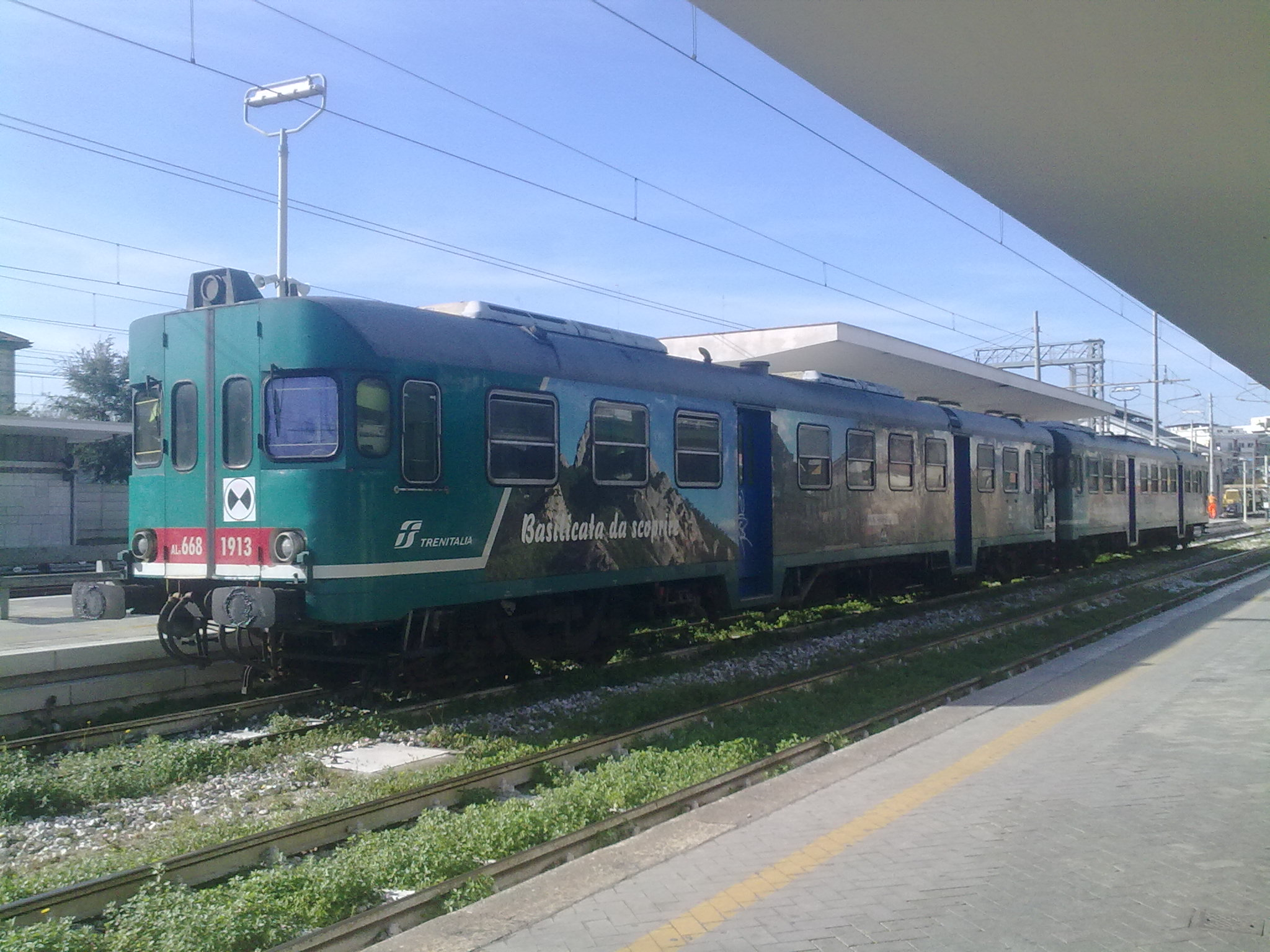
ALn 668.1900

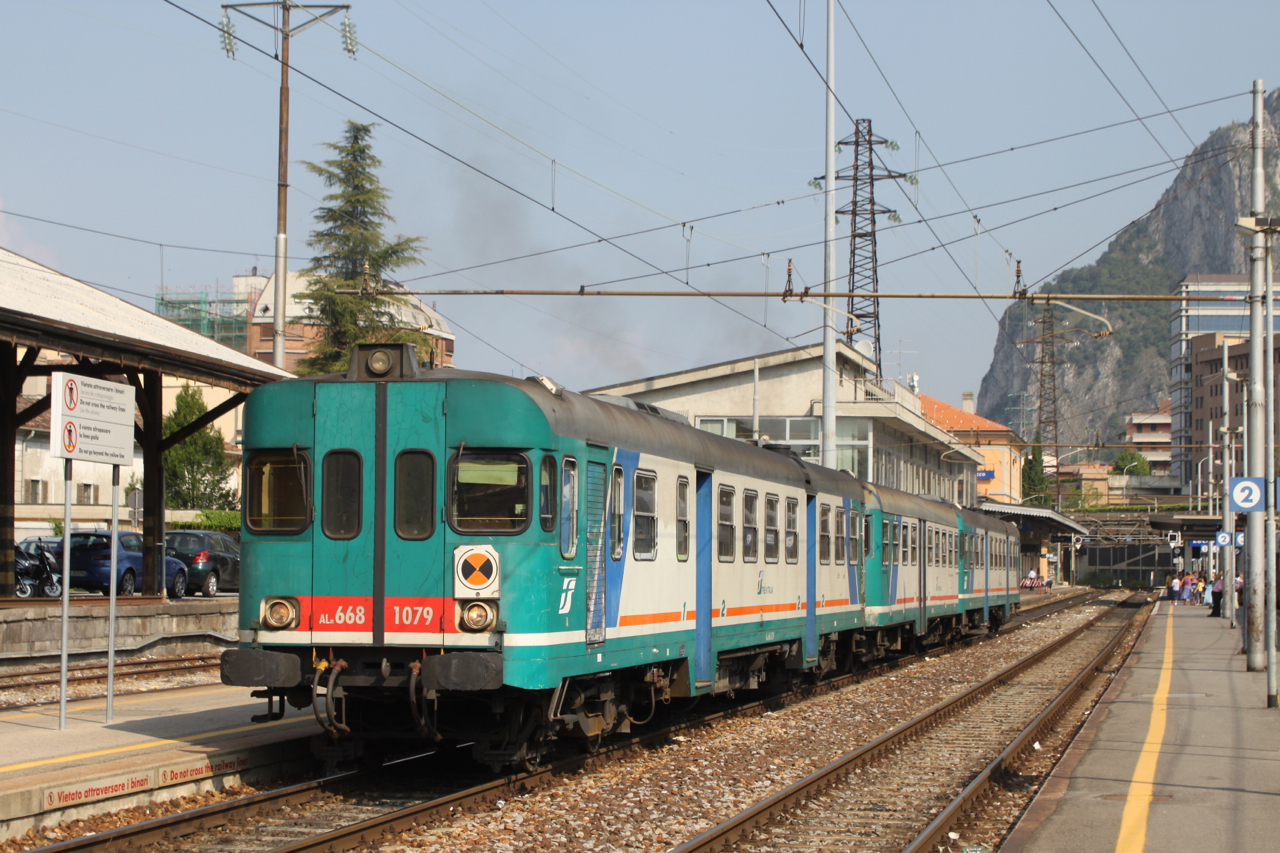
ALn 668.1000

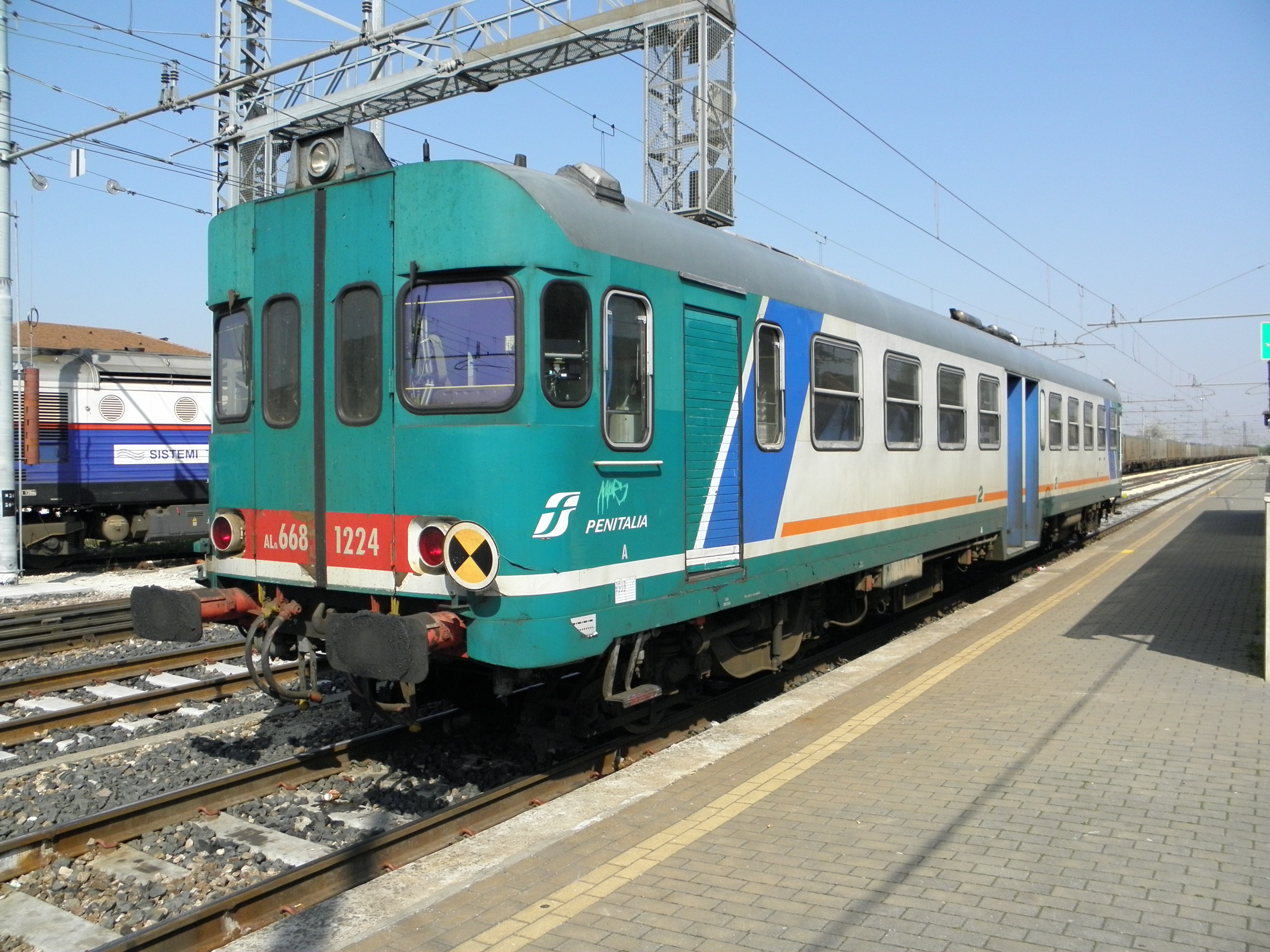
ALn 668.1200

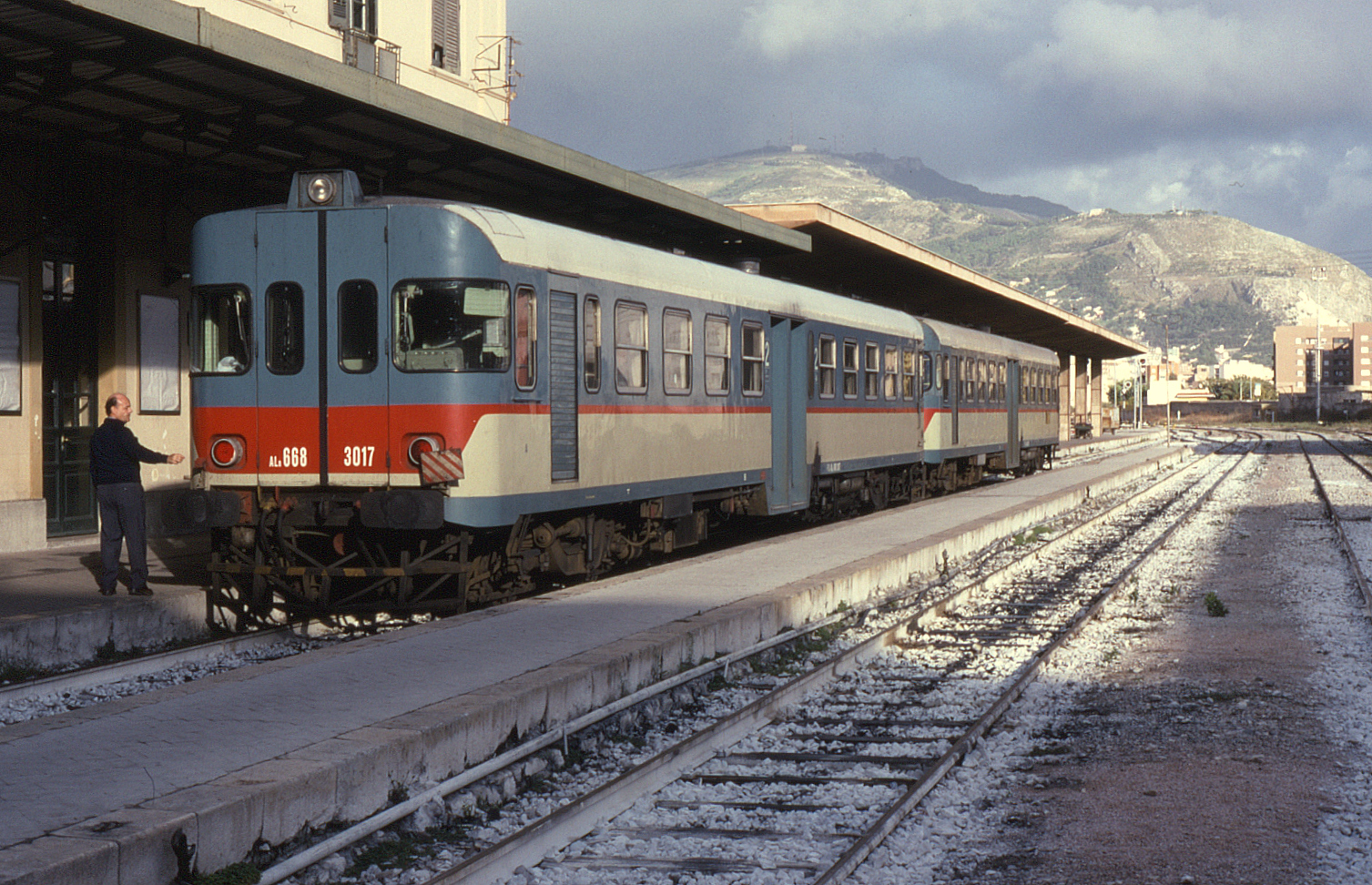
ALn 668.3000

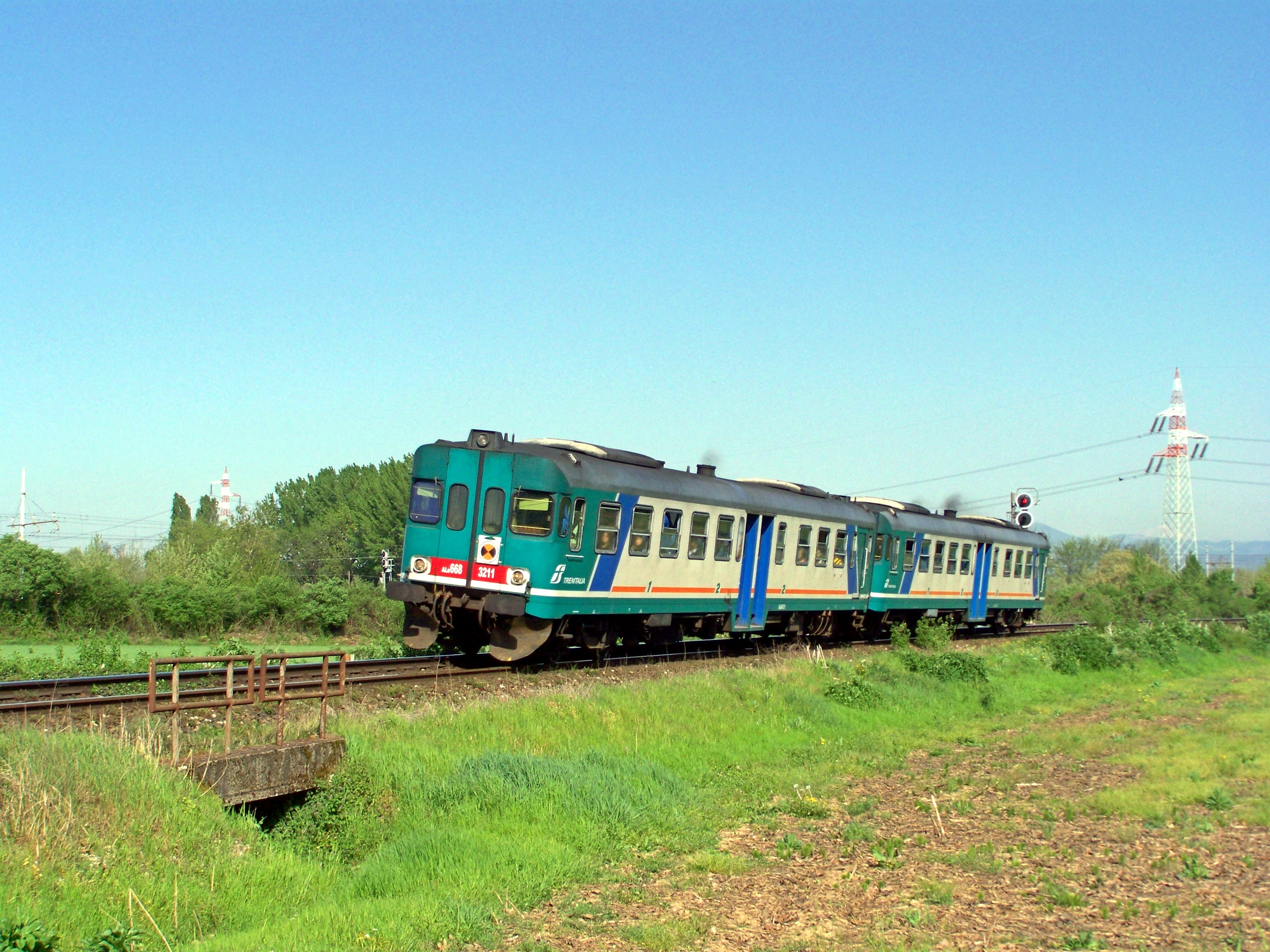
ALn 668.3100

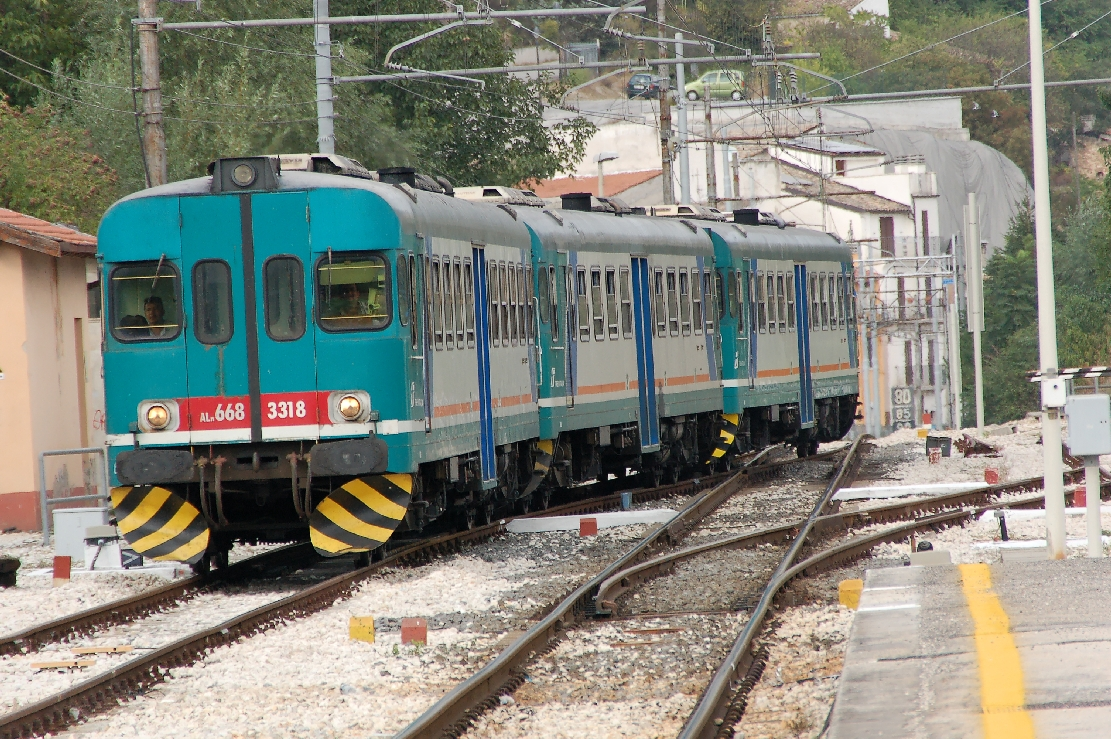
ALn 668.3300

== Operators ==
=== Ferrovie Emilia-Romagna ===
FER has operated a total of 29 ALn 668 railcars built between 1959 and 1983. These are of the types 668.1000, 668.1700, 668.1900 and 668.3000. A number of these have been taken out of service.

=== Ferrovie del Sud Est ===
FSE uses has 15 type ALn 668 trains numbered 31-45. These are a mix of 668.1000 and 668.1900 series. Most of these railcars are stored out of service. The remaining trains are operated in the region of Apulia around Martina Franca, Taranto and Lecce.

=== Sistemi Territoriali ===
ST has four type 668.1000 railcars numbered 668.605, 668.606, 668.609 and 668.610 which were delivered in 1980. They are used on minor lines in the Veneto region.
