= Zust =

Italian car manufacturing company

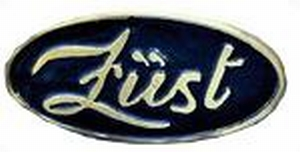
Original Zust logo

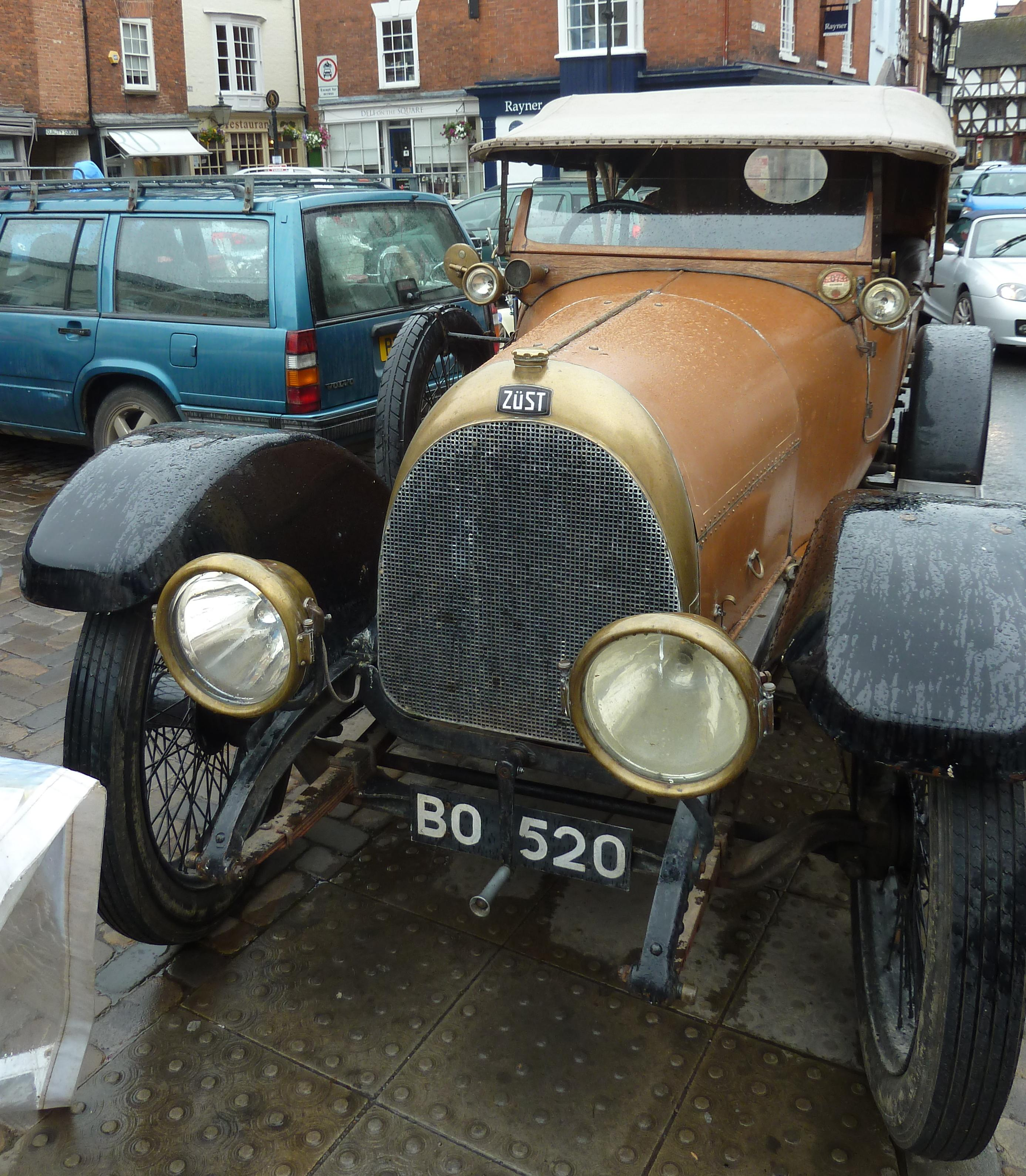
A 1912 28 hp model

Zust (originally Züst) was an Italian car manufacturing company operating from 1905 to 1917.

The company was founded by engineer Roberto Züst, an Italian industrialist of Swiss origin, who owned a precision tool manufacturing plant at Intra, near Lago Maggiore (formerly the Guller & Croff iron foundry). Züst experimented with prototypes of cars from around 1900 on and in Milan in 1905, he founded the Zust company for manufacturing cars and commercial vehicles. His first models were huge and expensive machines propelled by four-cylinder engines from 7432 cc (454cuin) to 11308 cc (690cuin). These were joined by a slightly smaller 5-litre (305cuin) model in 1908. A Zust 28/45 HP participated in the 1908 New York to Paris Race and finished third. Giustino Cattaneo (later of Isotta Fraschini) worked for him. In the year 1911, 250 automobiles were produced. In the year 1912, 200 automobiles and an additional 150 trucks were produced.

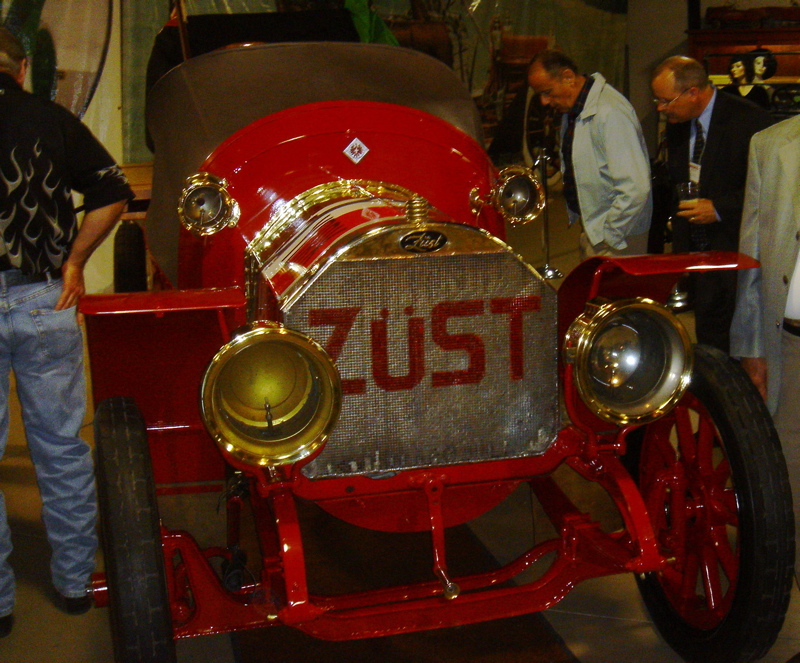
The 1906 Züst which took third place in the 1908 Race Around the World.

In 1906 Züst decided to also make smaller cars, so with his five sons he founded a new company known as Brixia-Zust in the city of Brescia. (Zust and Brixia-Zust are often confused). Due to financial problems, Brixia-Zust closed down in 1912; the Milan factory was sold and production of Zust cars concentrated in Brescia, where production continued until 1914. The last new models, the 15/25 HP or 2S 365 (2592 cc/158cuin) and the 25/35 or S305 (4712 cc/288cuin), appeared in 1913.

On October 1, 1917, the company was taken over by Officine Meccaniche of Milan, who continued to make the S305 until 1923 under their own name.

== Brixia-Zust ==
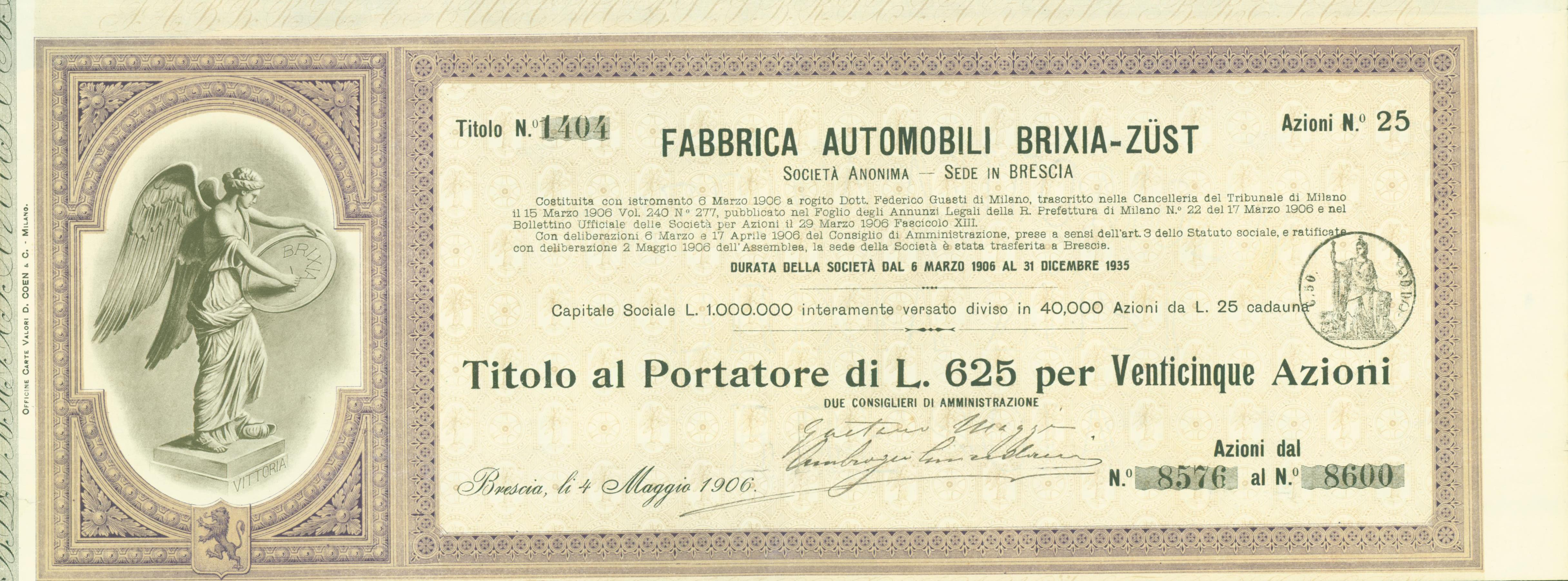
Share of the Fabrica Automobili Brixia-Züst, issued 4. May 1906

Brixia-Zust (originally Brixia-Züst) was an Italian car manufacturer also founded by engineer Roberto Züst, owner of Zust of Milan, and his sons. The company was situated in Brescia, Northern Italy; Brixia is the antique Latin for Brescia. The company made racing cars that participated in Targa Florio, an open road race in Sicily.

The most interesting model was the 10 hp in 1909, propelled by a three-cylinder 1495 cc engine. Car production ended—due to financial difficulties—in 1912. In 1918, after Officine Meccaniche took over the Zust company, the Brescia facilities were used.
