= Officine Meccaniche =

Italian machine and vehicle manufacturer

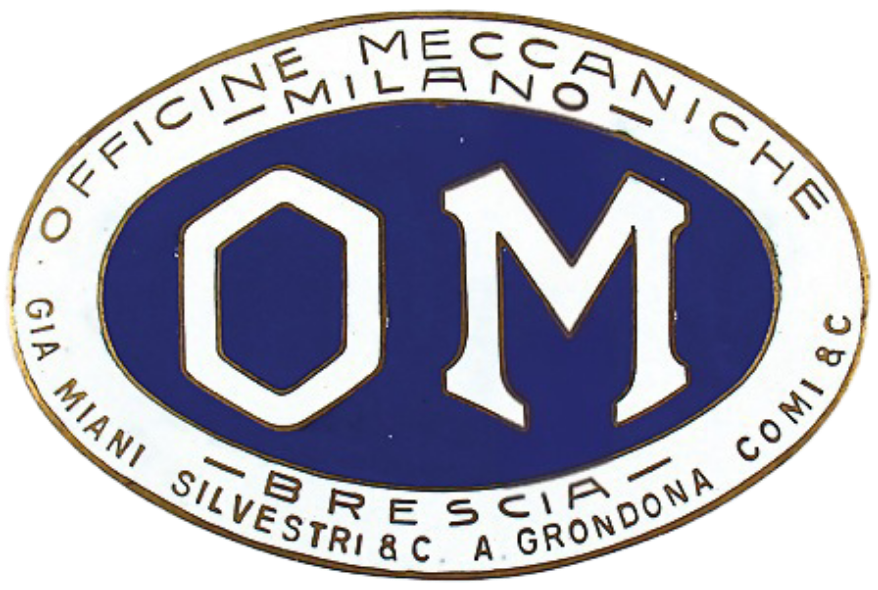
- Industry: Automotive
- Founded: 1899
- Defunct: 1975
- Fate: absorbed (as part of Fiat) into Iveco
- Headquarters: Milan, Italy (HQ); Brescia, Italy (Automotive)
- Products: Automobiles (Brescia; 1918–1934); Railroad locomotives and equipment (Milan); Commercial Vehicles (Brescia; 1925–1975)

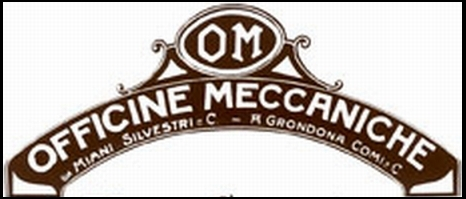
Miani e Silvestri&C-A.Grondona Comi&C

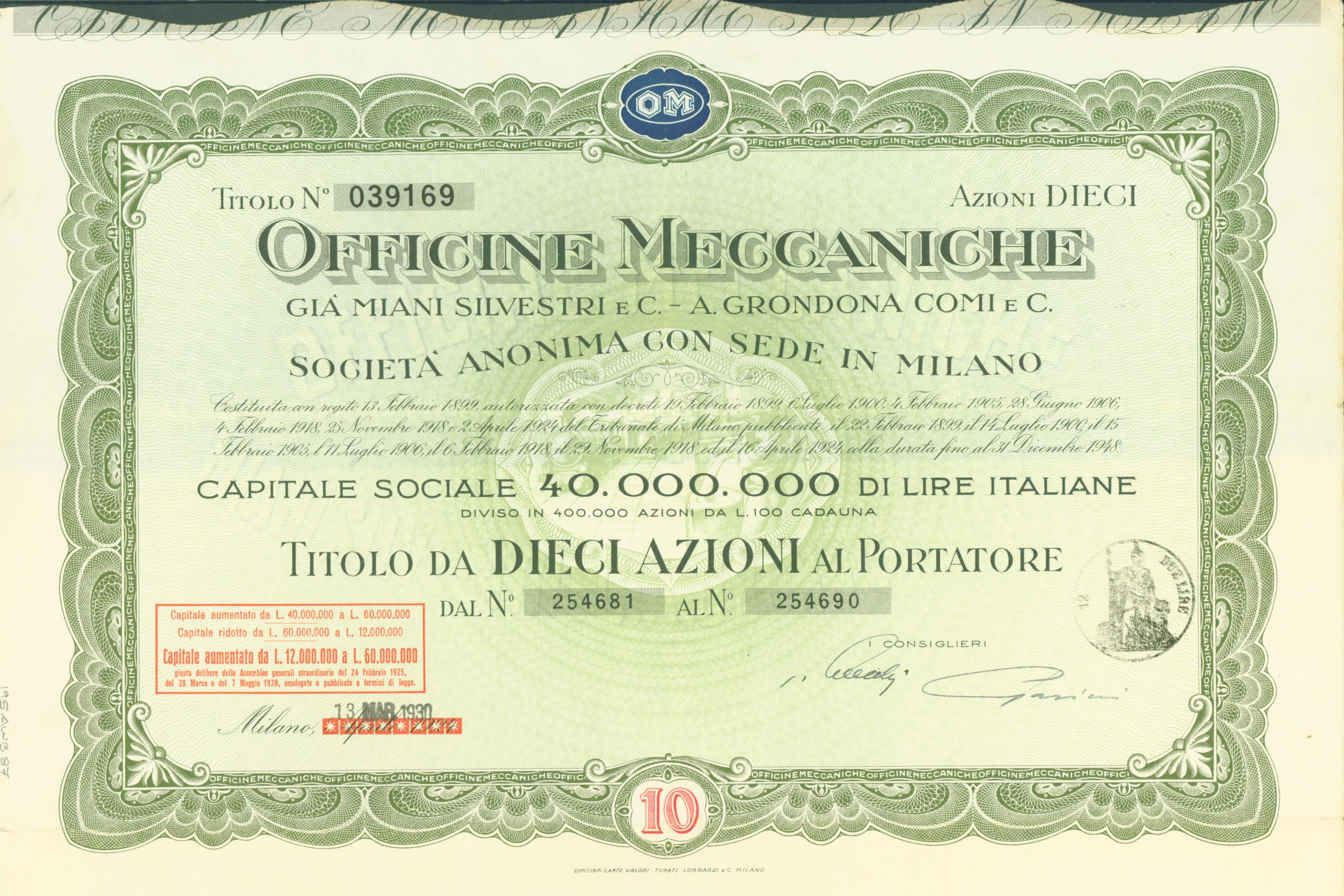
Share of the Officine Meccaniche, issued 13 March 1930

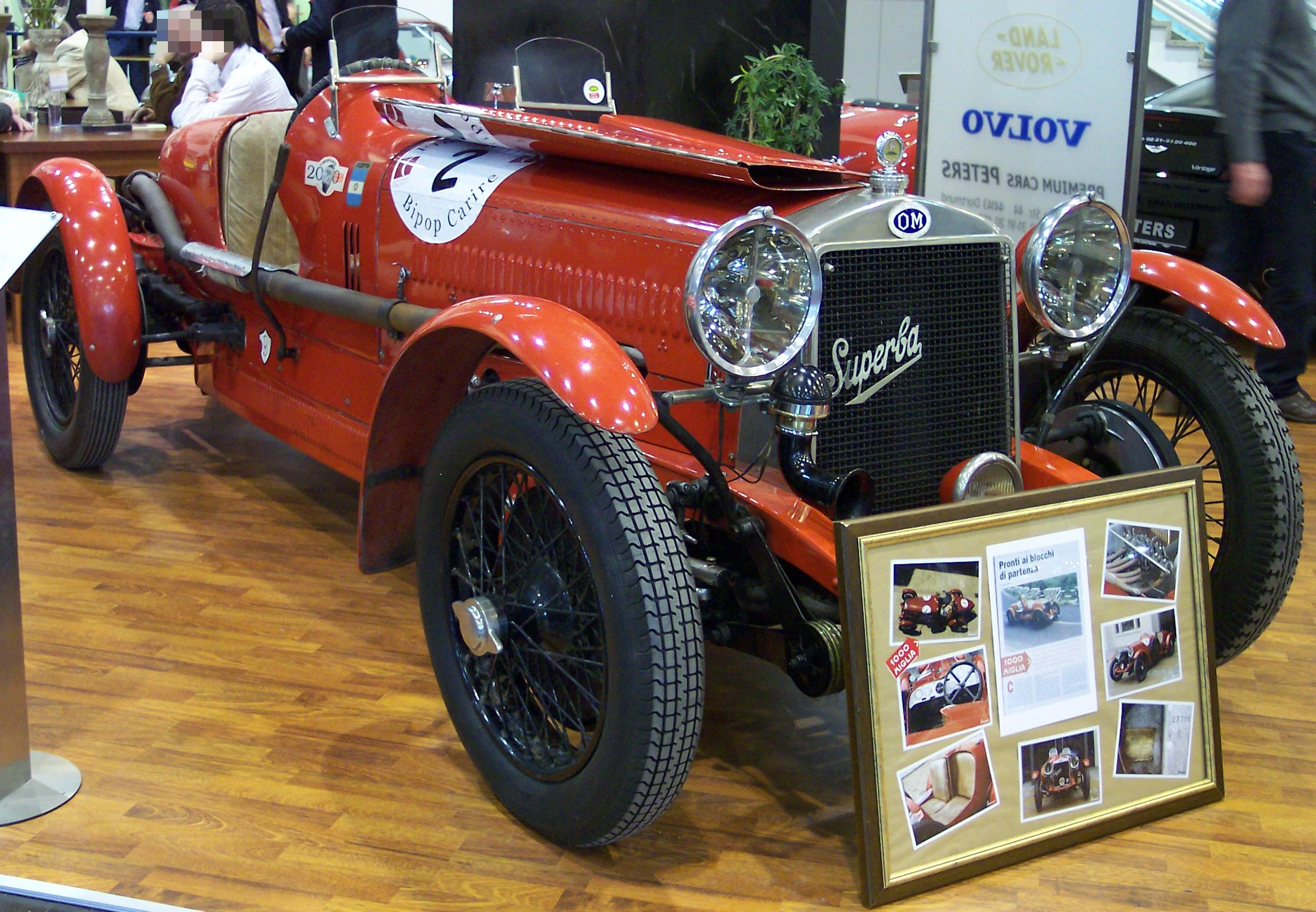
OM Superba 665 1929

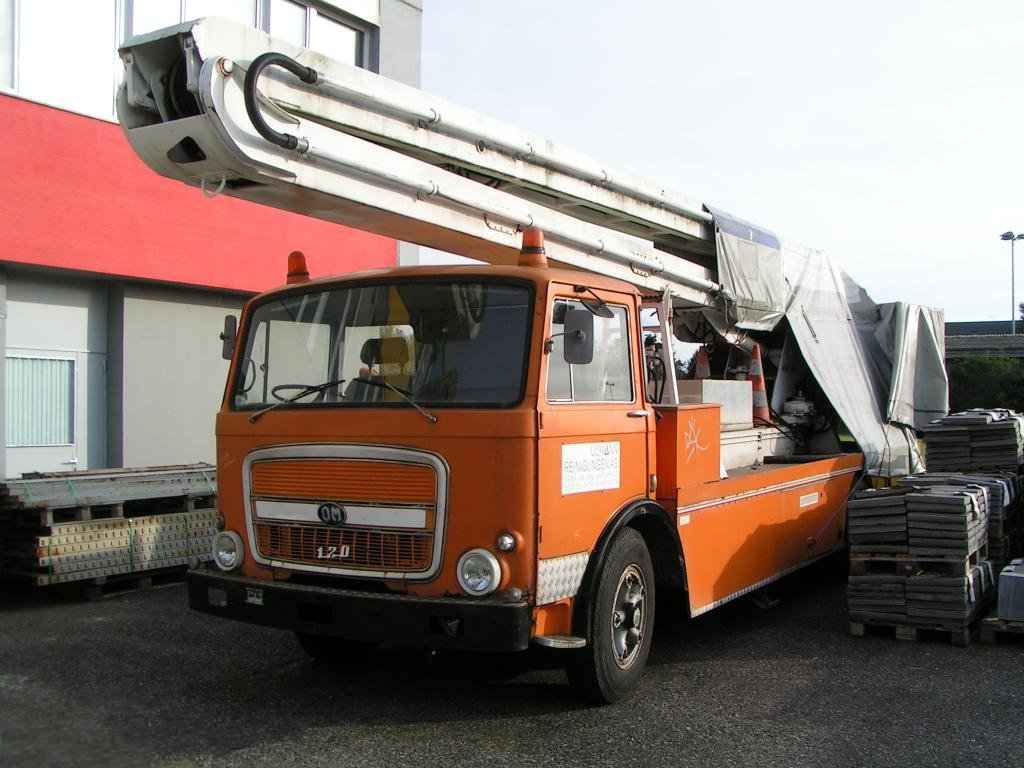
OM 120 truck

Officine Meccaniche or OM was an Italian car and truck manufacturing company. It was founded in 1899 in Milan as Società Anonima Officine Meccaniche to manufacture railway rolling stock and car production began in 1918. It disappeared as such in 1975, subsumed into Iveco, but still exists as a forklift builder.

== Origins ==
The inception of the company resulted from the merger of two companies, Grondona Comi & C and Miani Silvestri & C in 1899. Originally, OM manufactured railway stock. Car production started in 1918, using the plant of the former Brixia-Zust (Brixia-Züst), just after OM took over Zust car company of Brescia, Northern Italy. The first OM car, the Tipo S305, was derived from an old Zust model. It appeared in 1918, fitted with a 4,712-cubic-centimetre (287.5 cu in) inline four-cylinder, side-valve engine.

== The OM cars era ==
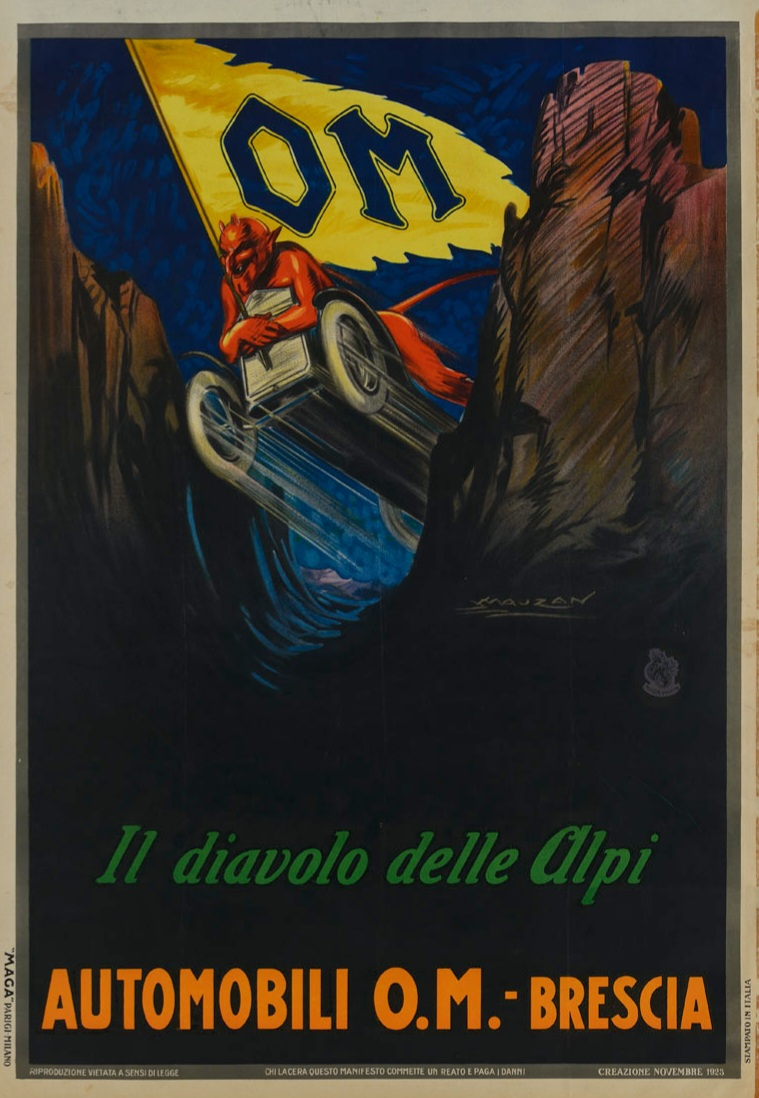
Poster Advertising OM Cars by Achille Mauzan

Further models were the Tipo 465, with a 1,327 cc (81.0 cu in), in 1919, joined by the Tipo 467 (1,410 cc or 86 cu in) and Tipo 469 (1,496 cc or 91.3 cu in) in 1921. The model names reflected the number of cylinders (4) and the bore of the engines: 65, 67 or 69 mm (2.56, 2.64 or 2.72 in). 1923 saw a new model, with an engine derived from the earlier four-cylinder models, the Tipo 665 'Superba' with a 2-litre (120 cu in) six-cylinder engine. This model was extremely successful in racing, winning top five positions in the 2-litre (120 cu in) class in 1925 and 1926 at the Le Mans but its greatest achievement was the victory in the first Mille Miglia race in 1927 where Ferdinando Minoia and Giuseppe Morandi led home an OM '1-2-3' finish at an average speed of 77.7 km/h (48.27 mph) for 21 hours 4 minutes 48 seconds. Some cars were equipped with Roots superchargers, while later models were bored and stroked to 2.2 and 2.4 litres - without changing the model name, however.

In 1925 OM began to build trucks and buses, using licensed Swiss Saurer engines and other mechanical components. Ties with Saurer persisted through all of OM's history. Passenger car production began to taper off, with some sources stating that production ended in 1932, with existing stocks sold for another couple of years. In total, 7,500 OM automobiles were built in about fifteen years. After passenger car had effectively ended, OM still displayed one last model: in 1934 the OMV, also called the Alcyone made the car show circuit. Equipped with hydraulic brakes, a full synchromesh transmission, and an engine with overhead exhaust valves, it never reached production.

== Fiat take-over and post-war years ==
OM was taken over by Fiat in 1933 and the following year passenger car sales definitely ceased; OM became strictly a commercial vehicle and train parts manufacturer.

The main new product in the post World War II era was the Leoncino (1950) a light truck in the 3.0 to 3.5 tonnes (3.3 to 3.9 short tons) range, which was an immediate success. It became the forefather of several series of heavier but structurally similar models, namely Tigrotto, Tigre, Lupetto, Cerbiatto and Daino, launched between 1957 and 1964. Bus chassis versions of several of these models were also available. After having been subsumed into Fiat, the lighter models were replaced by the OM numerical range beginning in 1967.

OM also built a heavier range of trucks, starting with the post-war Orione. This was succeeded by the Super Orione in 1955 and by the Titano in 1961. The latter was capable of pulling 35 tonnes (39 short tons) as a tractor or 19 tonnes (21 short tons) on the 6x4 truck chassis. Its 10,310 cc (629 cu in), six-cylinder turbo-diesel engine produced 260 hp (191 kW), making it the most powerful road-going European truck in the early 1960s. The Titano was discontinued in 1968 and effectively replaced by Fiat's heavier trucks, the Fiat 619 and the Fiat 682. As with the lighter duty models, bus versions were also available of the Titano, called the "Titano P."

In the 60s and 70s the light and medium-weight OM truck ranges were sold in Switzerland as Saurer-OM or Berna-OM, in Austria as Steyr-OM, in France as Unic-OM, and in Germany as Büssing-OM.

== The end of OM ==
In 1968 OM was definitively merged into Fiat as a brand belonging to the Commercial Vehicles division, which also included Fiat and Unic. In 1975 it was absorbed into Iveco and the OM brand gradually disappeared from the truck and bus markets, although it still survives as an independent forklift manufacturer.

== Products ==
- FS Class ALn 772
- OM X-series

== See also ==
- List of Italian companies
- 1925 24 Hours of Le Mans
- 1926 24 Hours of Le Mans
- Tripoli Grand Prix
