= FS Class ALn 772 =

FS ALn 772
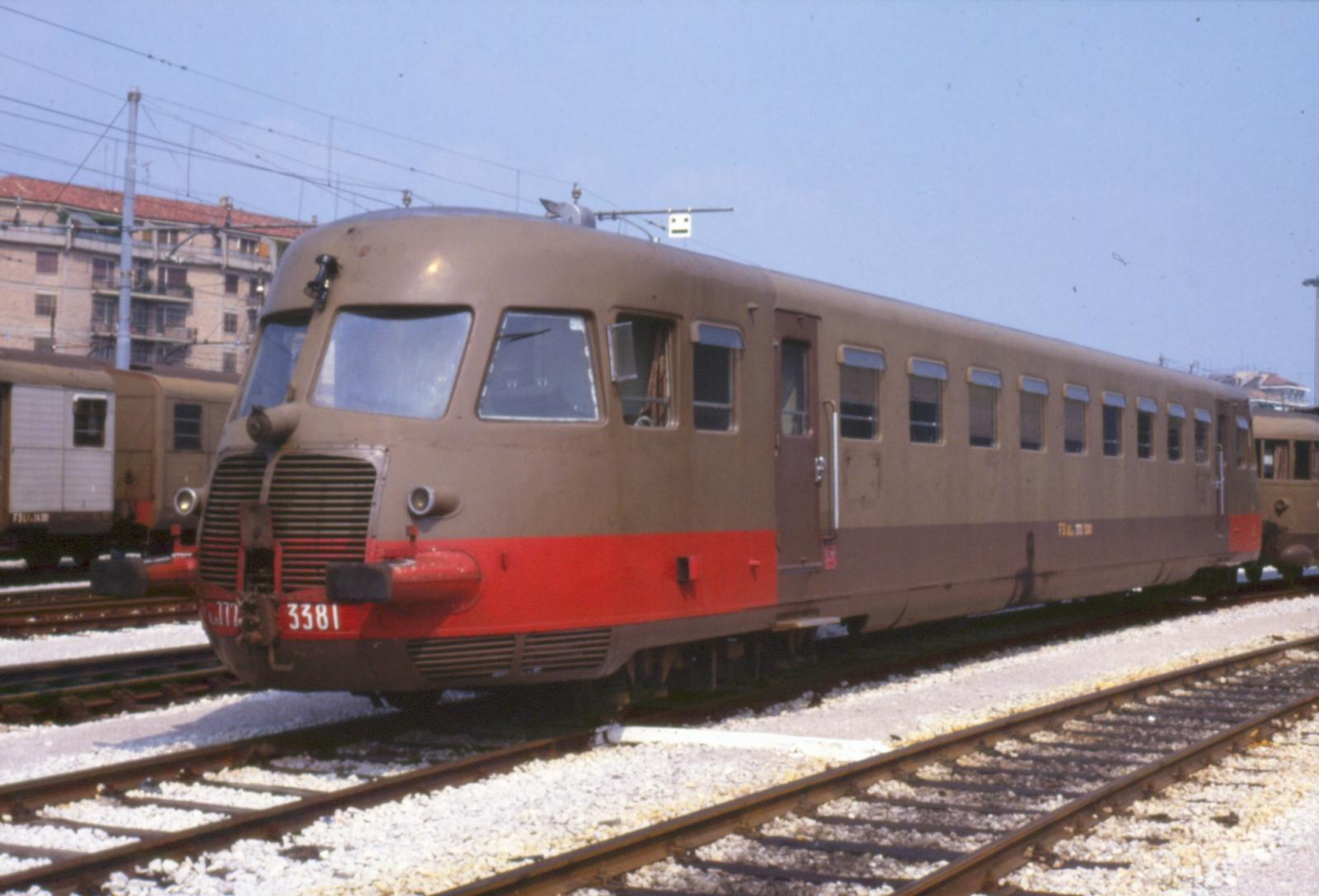
Type and origin
- Power type: Diesel
- Builder: Fiat Ferroviaria-Officine Meccaniche (OM)
- Build date: 1937 – 1957
- Total produced: 327 total: 100 Fiat; 219 OM (4 series); 8 special
Specifications
- Gauge: 1,435 mm (4 ft 8 1/2 in) standard gauge
- Wheel diameter: 900 mm (35.43 in)
- Wheelbase: 16 m (52 ft 5 7/8 in)
- Length: 24.560 m (80 ft 6 7/8 in)
- Width: 3.160 m (10 ft 4 3/8 in)
- Height: 3.564 m (11 ft 8 3/8 in)
- Loco weight: ALn 772: 37 t (36 long tons; 41 short tons); SD80 version: 34.2 t (33.7 long tons; 37.7 short tons)
- Prime mover: 2 x OM-Saurer BXD
- Engine type: 6-cyl inline engine
- Cylinders: 6
- Cylinder size: 2.38 L (145 cu in)
- Transmission: hydraulic OM-SRM-DF 1,15
Performance figures
- Maximum speed: 130 km/h (81 mph)
- Power output: 220 kW (299 PS)
Career
- Operators: Ferrovie dello Stato
- Nicknames: Littorina
- Locale: Italy, Poland
- First run: May 1940
- Retired: April 12, 1986

The ALn 772 (Automotrice Leggera a nafta, Light Diesel motor car) series are a group of Diesel railcars built for the Italian public railway company Ferrovie dello Stato (FS) between the 1930s and the 1950s. As the first project in Italy to abandon the automobile-derived design and adopt a comprehensive "rolling stock" approach, it represents the link between the simple and sturdy Littorine and the modern Diesel units.

== Background ==
The design of the ALn 772 series draws on the well-established experience that Fiat built into the first railway engines ordered by the Fascist government of Benito Mussolini, the ATR 100 and the later Littorine ALn 56 and ALn 556.

The increasing demand for passenger transport and the growth of the tourism business during the 1940s, driven by the government's sponsorship of mass tourism (villeggiature popolari) and by the transformation of the railways into mass transport, required FS to put into service a growing number of faster and more comfortable passenger trains. This new generation of rolling stock was to supplement the existing Littorine on the new Direttissimo and Rapido services (two kind of fast links between major cities).

The service requirements called for a huge quantity of new stock in a limited time frame. Rather than buying more units of the existing specialized designs, FS decided to specify a single "unified" type which would be able to fulfill different mission profiles. Maintenance operations would also benefit from the availability of standard spare parts, a quite unusual feature in Italy at the time.

The specifications required the new units to provide not only higher speeds but also increased capacity and better passenger comfort; at least 70 well-spaced seats, 1st- and 2nd-class only, were mandated. The approved design had a total of 72 seats, hence the 772 designation; the doubling of the leading number indicates multiple unit capability.

== General description ==
The increased passenger capacity, wider spaces and higher comfort levels were a good answer to all requirements specified by FS and a great progress compared to earlier models then in service. However, despite their multiple-unit capability, the lack of passageways meant that the ALn 772 units were not really suitable for multiple trainsets; this shortcoming will be addressed by the later models ALn 880.

The cars featured two small driver's cabs at both ends, which housed the vertical engines and transmission groups. The two platforms behind the driver's cabs were not identical; the first one, giving access to a small lavatory, was bigger and fitted with some folding seats; the one on the opposite side had a small luggage compartment. Both could be accessed by one door on each side of the car, giving access in turn to the driver's cab and the main passenger compartment.

The latter was divided in three areas: a 2nd-class compartment with 24 seats on the lavatory side, arranged in twin facing rows; a 16-seats 1st-class compartment in the middle, with the same arrangement; and another 32 2nd-class seats on the luggage compartment side. A central aisle ran for the entire length of the car.

With a few exceptions described below, the paint scheme was the standard brown-and-red of the time, called castano-isabella.

== History ==
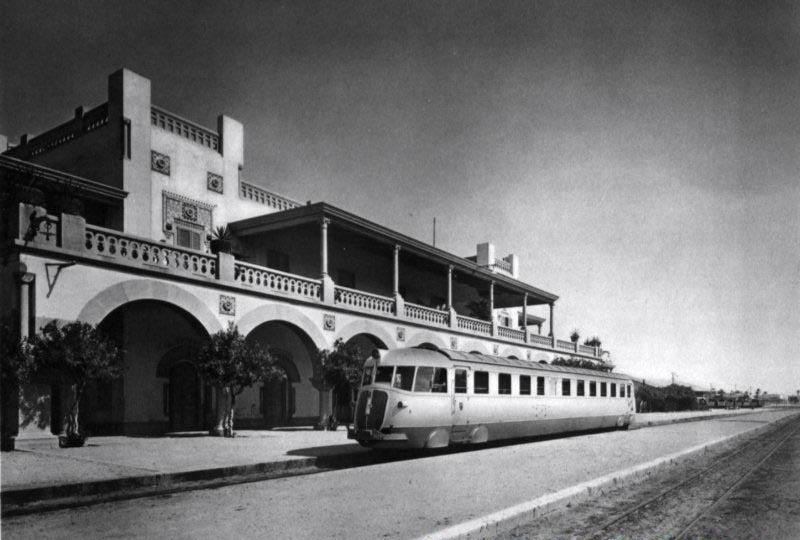
Fiat "Littorina" at Tripoli (Libya) railway Station in 1950

Shunning the bigger companies like Fiat and Breda, FS ordered three prototypes of the new units to an experienced but smaller producer of parts and components based in Milan, Officine Meccaniche di Milano (OM). The contract was quite challenging for OM, who until then had never managed to build a new line of rolling stock as the main contractor; that was the well-guarded fief of the two giants of the Italian heavy industry. The prototypes, built around the Fiat ALn 72 chassis, were delivered in 1937 and designated with the non-standard codes ALn 72 3001-3003.

After the initial tests showed results far above expectations, FS awarded OM a contract for about 200 units. The effort was too big to be dealt with by the outfitter alone, and Fiat was chosen as a partner to build the chassis and the car mechanics. The electrical and technical parts were to be built internally by OM. To make accounting easier, the contract was formally split between the two builders. The cars were divided pro-forma into three series: the first was a single lot of 100 units to be delivered by Fiat, with numbers from 1001 to 1100; the remaining 96 units were to be delivered by OM in two series, the first lot being numbered from 3201 to 3250 and the second one from 3251 to 3296.

The first series unit was delivered by Fiat in May 1940. After a testing session along the Faentina railway line in Tuscany, the 772.1001 car was certified as compliant to FS specifications and brought into service; the first OM-built unit was delivered in November of the same year. Building of the first 196 units continued at a regular pace up to 1943. In 1939 the local railways Ferrovie Padane bought the three prototype cars from FS and two years later ordered from OM two additional units (FP ALn 72 1004-1005). Those units were equipped with a different transmission gearing, which slowed them to a maximum speed of 100 km/h while providing the cars with 8 kW (11 hp) of additional power.

The outbreak of World War II reduced dramatically the request for passenger transport during the following years, except for large army convoys which were unsuited to the small Littorine; both Breda and OM converted their production to war effort. The ALn 772 diesel engines were brand-new, powerful and compact, so they were mostly cannibalized to equip the Italian Navy's MAS torpedo boats. Fuel shortages and heavy bombing along the railroads made the remaining units useless for several years.

OM could resume production only in 1948, thanks to the economic relief provided by the Marshall Plan and the huge efforts into bringing back the mangled national rail network to its pre-war standards. From 1948 to 1957 OM delivered 123 more units (two series, 3301-3341 and 3342-3423), demonstrating a slow but steady recovery of its factories from the devastation caused by the war. Existing pre-war units were almost spared by the conflict, but were not untouched. Five units had to be scrapped, a couple of them without ever entering service, while 27 more were too badly damaged to be recovered and were dismantled to use as spare parts.

In 1949 the SIF company, manager of the private railway Siena-Buonconvento-Monte Antico, ordered two additional cars to OM; unlike the FS units, which had a 4-number code, these were originally numbered 101 and 102. The units were refit to carry 16 first-class and 56 second-class seats, while the third unit (marked as Ln86.106) was modified for third-class service with 86 seats and no engine. Later on, with SIF's acquisition by FS in 1956, the three units were brought back to standard codes: the powered units were renumbered as ALn 772 3297–3298, and the powerless car was refitted with engines and transformed in ALn 772.3299.

After the war the most "noble" rolling stock (mainly ETR200s) was terribly damaged: the ALn 772 units had to be used to provide rapid service in the whole Italian peninsula, especially on the high-profile services of Milan-Venice-Trieste; Palermo-Messina; Taranto-Bari and Ancona; Cagliari-Olbia, and later on in Sicily. The huge number of available ALn 772 cars in post-war Italy led to their use even on less important services and secondary lines. Some of them were even used on "emergency recover", a quite unusual duty for a fast passenger vehicle. During the 1950s, the ALn 772 were the true backbone of Italy's fast passenger fleet.

Meanwhile, the fortunes of the series were not limited to the FS fleet, or to Italy alone: in 1949 three more special units were delivered to the Polish railways PKP, to be replicated and to serve on fast routes. In Italy, the former Ferrovie Padane units were re-branded as ALn 772 in 1961 and assigned to charter trains; one of them is still in service as of late 2006. The ALn 772.1009 unit, refitted with a first-class lounge, was brought back to its original fitting in 1970.

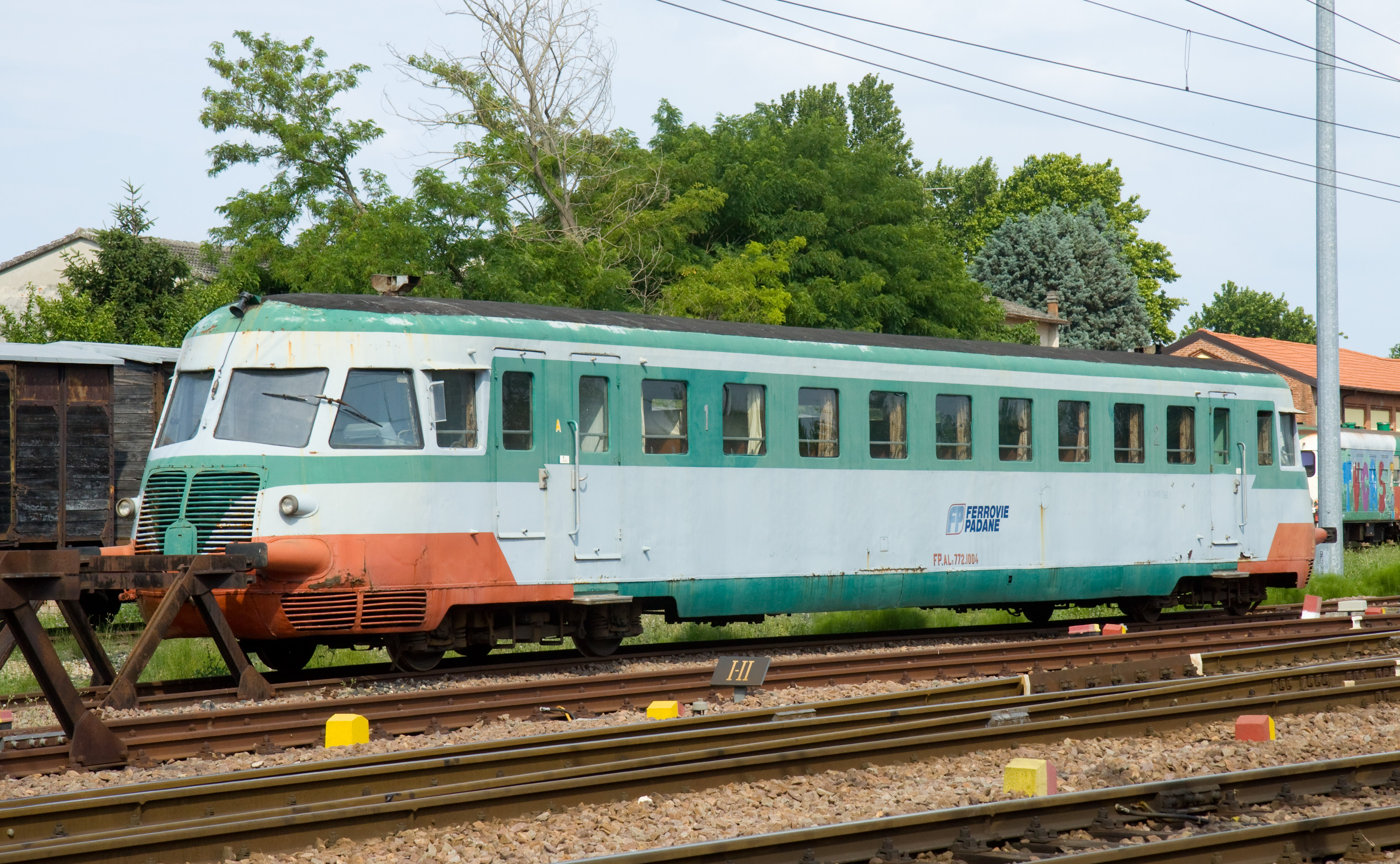
ALn 772 of Ferrovie Padane

The 772 series only begun to become obsolete in the 1970s, while being replaced by the new ALn 773 and ALn 668 introduced specifically for fast and short-range services. At the same time, the age of the 772 stock and their extremely intense use had made breakdowns more and more frequent, particularly on the hydrodynamic circuit and the exhaust systems. Moreover, the asbestos coating was beginning to wear down and was not compliant with the stricter health safety regulations concerning its use.

In 1981 the routine maintenance was suspended, and the group was scheduled to be dismissed in a very short time frame. Only two units (3247 and 3326) were kept in active service on the Novara-Varallo Sesia line: on April 12, 1986, the railway administration issued a service order relegating all remaining units to the shed. The units were then decommissioned and after lying abandoned for some time, were scrapped in an extremely short timespan.

Only five of them survived this fate (see Preserved units below).

== Technical details ==
The ALn 772 units were the first to be equipped with an experimental Ljungström hydrostatic transmission (model OM-SRM-DF 1,15); the initial results were good. It was only years later, with age and the increased frequency of start-stop cycles required by the short-range services the units had been reassigned to, that the transmission gearing started to show heavy signs of wear and reliability problems.

The chassis, while similar in design to the earlier ALn 556, was one of the first in Italy to be electrically welded; the soundproofing was efficiently achieved thanks to the massive usage of asbestos fiber. With age, this material decayed, becoming dangerous for human health: this is the main reason why so few units were saved from scrapping.

The twin BXD engines equipping the ALn 772 units were built by OM under license of the Swiss patent holder Adolph Saurer AG. With a displacement of 14.330 litres (874.5 cu in), each of the straight-6, direct-injection, naturally aspirated engines had a power rating of 110 kW (150 PS) at 1,500 rpm, with a total of 299 PS per unit. In the fourth series, the engine was adapted to a new fuel pump which was deemed more reliable, and was consequently renamed OM-BXD-54.

The huge displacement of the BXD engines required a steady and massive air intake in order to keep an optimal air-fuel ratio. The problem was solved by the OM engineers by placing the engines at the two extremities of the unit, hidden behind a huge cast iron grid equipped with wide air intakes. The new engines were not fitted straight on the bogies (the common technology in the 1930s), but were suspended over the chassis in order to dampen vibrations.

The bogies, in turn, not having to sustain the engines' weight, were redesigned by taking inspiration from those of the first electrical railway motor cars: they featured journal boxes on the external part of the frame, a main volute spring suspension and an auxiliary one based on the traditional leaf-spring design. This bogie design, which was very easy to build and maintain, also proved to be very reliable in the long run.

== The Polish versions: SD80 and SR70 ==
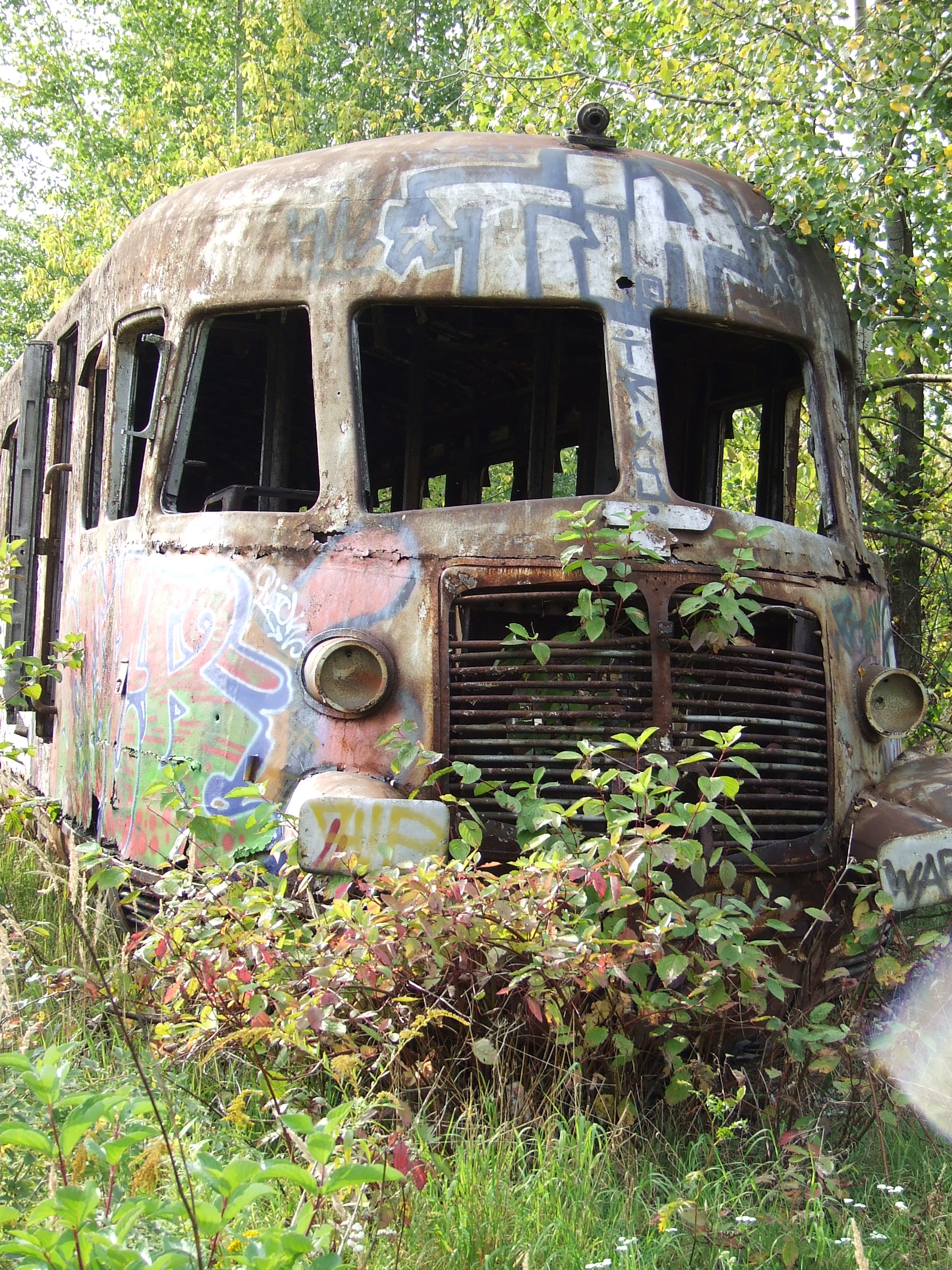
An SD80, a discontinued Polish version of the ALn 772.

After WWII, the Polish national railways PKP (Polskie Koleje Panstwowe) faced the task of rapidly rebuilding the whole of their rolling stock, but the national economy had been destroyed by the war. During the German and Soviet occupations, whole factories were dismantled and stolen, to be rebuilt in the mainland of the occupying country. Most railway lines were out of service: the steel tracks had been stolen, the lines were bombed.

The main priority was rebuilding the Polish passenger service in short time: electrified lines were far too expensive, as were powerful steam locomotives, so the Diesel motor car technology was chosen as the cheapest and fastest to set up.

In the past PKP had already used some motor cars, mainly built by Hipolit Cegielski, in Poznań, by Fablok in Chorzów, or by Lilpop, Rau & Loewenstein in Warsaw. They included a fleet of six fast cars called Luxtorpeda, with top speed of 120 km/h (75 mph), which operated from 1934 to 1939 between Warsaw, Katowice, Kraków, Zakopane and Poznań. Railcars were also used between Lwów and Boryslaw.

Even after the destruction caused by the war, Italy could boast a top-level know-how in railway technologies, and the Marshall Plan investments were pushing the most important heavy industries to a quick recovery of their production capabilities: one of the first goals achieved was restarting the ALn 772 production lines.

Conversely, Italy was burdened by a serious lack of good coal. National production was very low, and the imported Balkan coal was of poor quality, its dangerous fumes leading to such accidents as the Train 8017 disaster which occurred in Balvano in 1944 – one of the worst ever rail accidents in Europe, with over 500 victims.

Being aware of this situation, Franciszek Tatara, then president of the agency controlling the Poznań vehicle factory, had the idea of buying some of the new Italian cars and paying them with good-quality coal. The ALn 772s were chosen because their design was quite similar to pre-war Polish cars; replicating them locally would thus be an easier task.

The ALn 772 design was then used by OM to build a special group of three units, which were named SD80 and marked with codes 09051 to 09053, which were then transferred to Poland in 1949, through Austrian and Czech railways. But the government plans of building a Polish version of ALn 772 soon proved impossible for technical reasons: in post-war Poland no companies could be found with the precision skills and production capability which were necessary to build the engines and transmissions for the new vehicles; moreover, the availability of steel and other required materials was scarce.

The units entered into service during 1951, as intercity trains, at first under the designation MsBx, then MsAx from 1956, following the scrapping of the third class. They were used at first on the Warsaw-Cracow line, then (from 1953 to 1959) on the Warsaw-Gdynia line; at that time, they started being unable to cope with the increasing passenger traffic and were replaced by conventional steam trains.

On 1960, the three Italian motor cars were renamed SD80-01 to SD80-03 and moved to the East Warsaw compartment, where they were divided: the first two entered into service between Warsaw, Bydgoszcz and Poznań, while #03 was used at first for the express train Blekitna Fala (Blue Wave) doing Summer runs between Miedzyzdroje and Warsaw; it was then moved to the Gdynia line for the rest of the year. The Blekitna Fala was the fastest train in the PKP fleet during the 1960s, with an average speed of 100.9 km/h (62.7 mph).

The SD80 units were to remain in service in Poland until 1967, albeit with smaller roles after 1962 since they were replaced by the Hungarian SN61. In 1962 they were used for a short time as LECH trains (rapid passenger trains) between Warsaw and Poznań with an average speed of over 90 km/h (56 mph), until the electrification of the line the following year. Then they were removed and underwent heavy restoration works from 1963 to 1966.

Officially retired in 1967, they were converted to SR70 units and assigned to inspection service until 1974, this time based in South Gdansk. Unit #01 was dismissed on January 1, 1969, #03 on December 31, 1972 (but it had been out of service since 1967) and #02 remained in use until April 30, 1974, having been used from 1969 to 1971 as a staff train.

The service records of the #03 unit, the only ones that have been preserved, showed that the motor car has run for 904.218 kilometres (561.855 mi), with average speeds of 75 to 100 km/h (47 to 62 mph).

Of the three units, only #02 was preserved for some time in the Warsaw Railway Museum. The car was later removed and abandoned, without any apparent explanation, just 500 metres (1,600 ft) away from the museum yard. The wreck was abandoned, prone to vandalism and decay. By the end of 2009 the heavily damaged wreck was again secured after a newspaper article and a pressure from railway fans. There is a plan of full reconstruction of the car, yet by August 2017 no actual works have been undertaken.

== Preserved ALn 772 units ==
The following are all known ALn 772 preserved units as of January 2008:

- ALn 772.1033: On display at the Piedmont Railway Museum (Museo Ferroviario Piemontese) in Savigliano. Until June 2007 it was the last unit from the FS fleet still in working order, following extensive restoration work by the association running the museum.
- ALn 772.3244 and Ln 772.3261: Both on static display in Assemini.
- ALn 772.3247: Refitted and used as a testbed for the STS (SoCiMi Tilting System); white livery, brown windows and red hull.
- ALn 772.3265: As of 2007, this unit has been refitted with new engines and, assigned to Pistoia Historic Rail Depot, provides frequent historical trains in Tuscany Railways.
- ALn 772.3374: Used for a joint project by Fiat and the Italian national research institution CNR, to test bogies with independent dampers on each wheel.

The engines were removed and code changed to Vp.car.99-999-072. The engineless unit reached 160 km/h (99 mph) in a controlled test. The technologies developed by the research project proved unfit for railway use, but were recycled in the Formula One racing activities of the Fiat group.

- ALn 772.3375: Not in working order, on display at the Pietrarsa National Railway Museum (Museo nazionale delle ferrovie di Pietrarsa) in Portici.
- ALn 772 FP: In working order and in use as a charter train by Ferrovie Padane.
- ALn 772.3263: since 2007 at Cagliari, 2015 moved to heritage trains depot of Pistoia, near Firenze. Not in working order, will be restored.

== Gallery ==
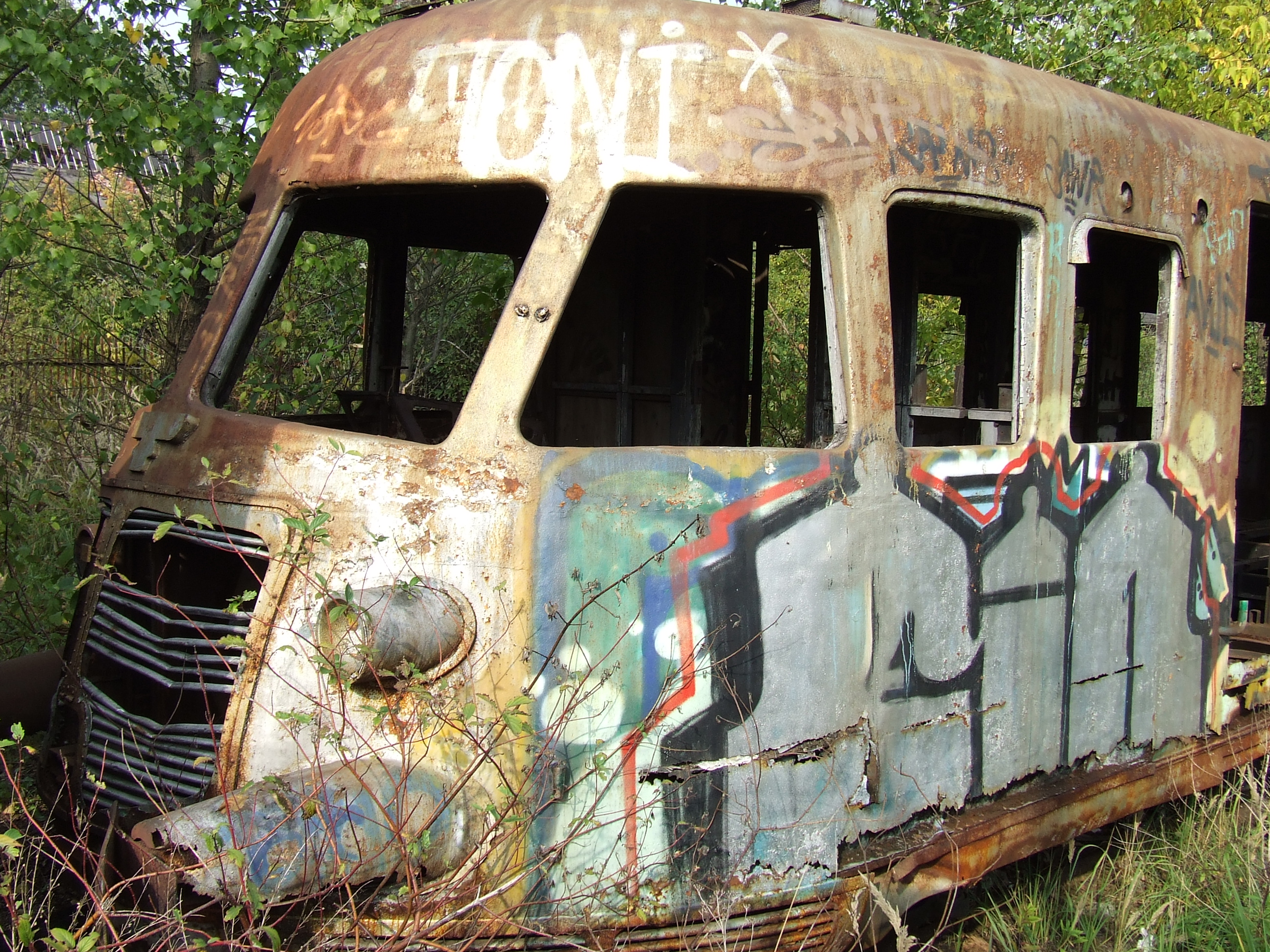
Side view of a scrapped Polish SD80 model

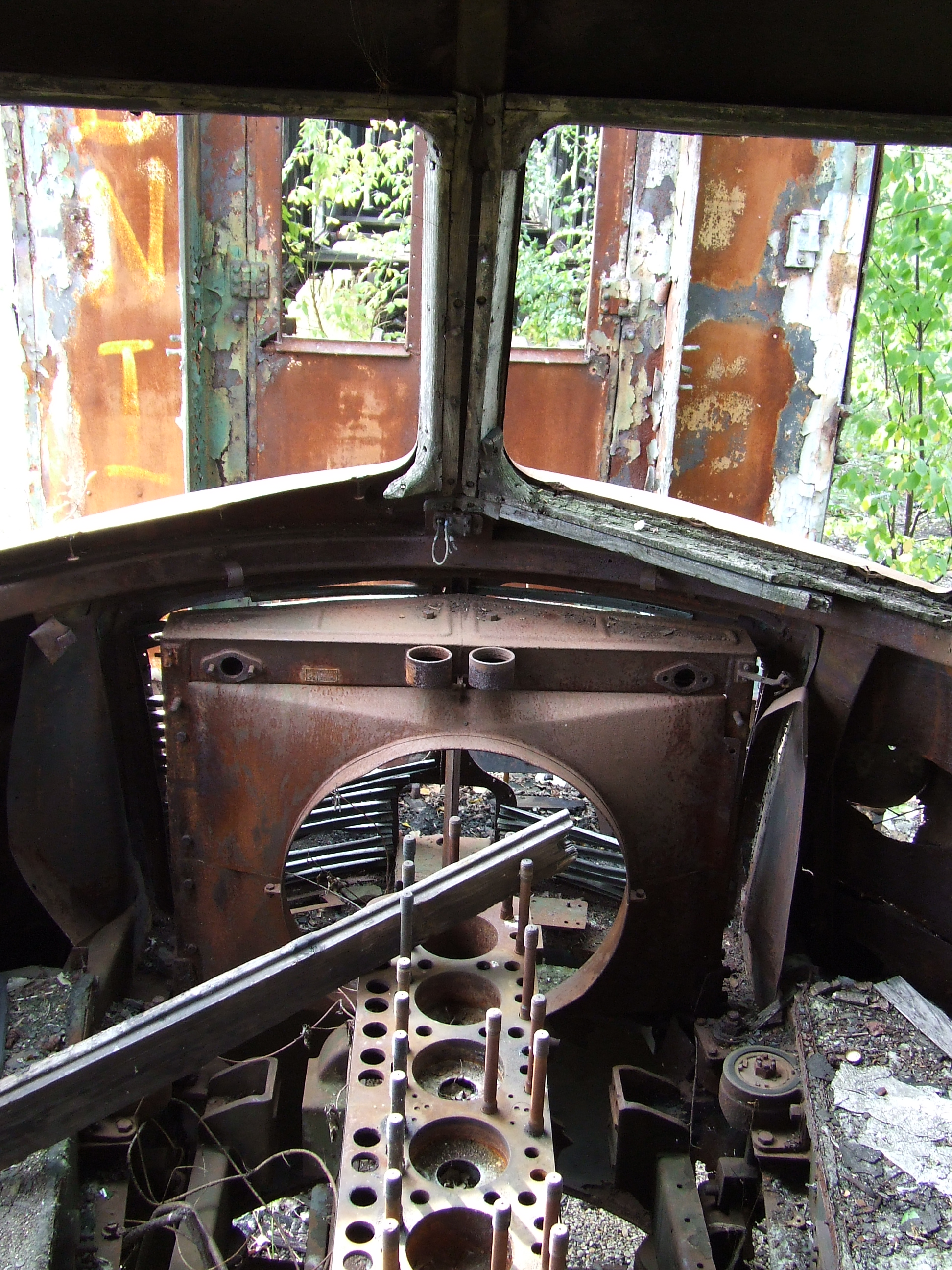
Interior view of the driver's cab, SD80

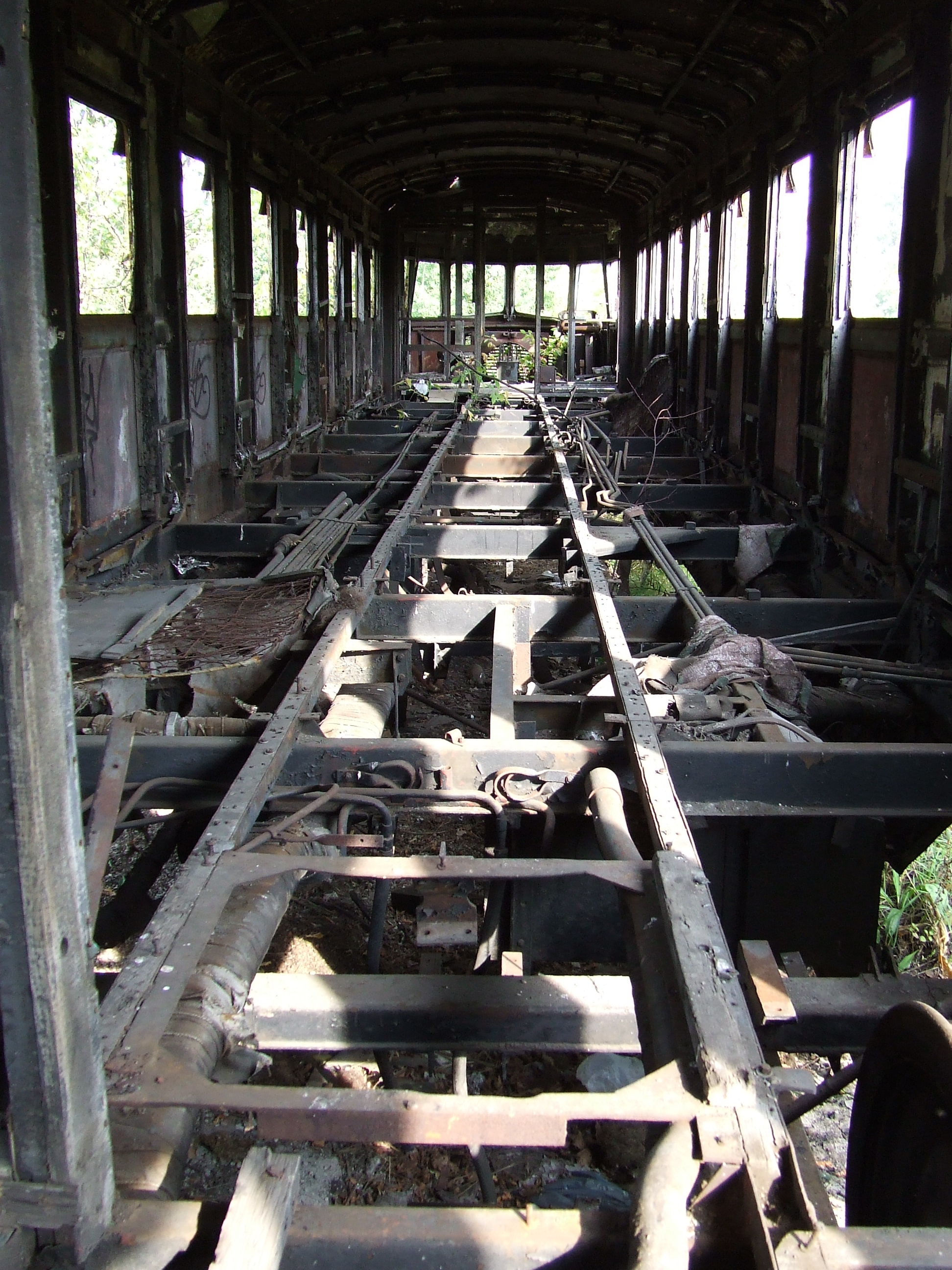
Interior view of the chassis, SD80

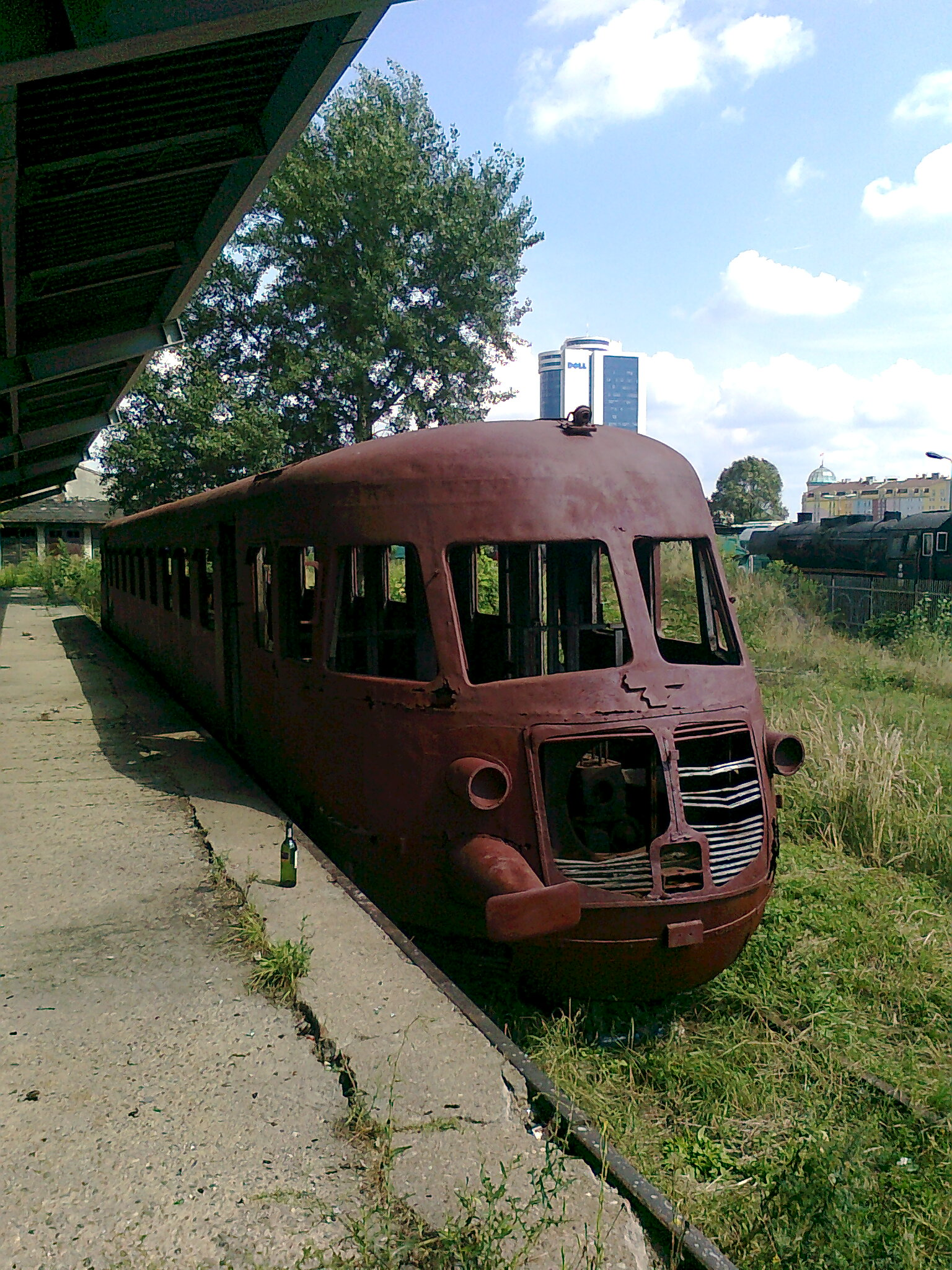
Previously fated for scrap, now awaiting restoration, coated with anti-rust paint
