= Palermo =

City in Sicily, Italy

Palermo Palermu (Sicilian)
- Comune
- Comune di Palermo
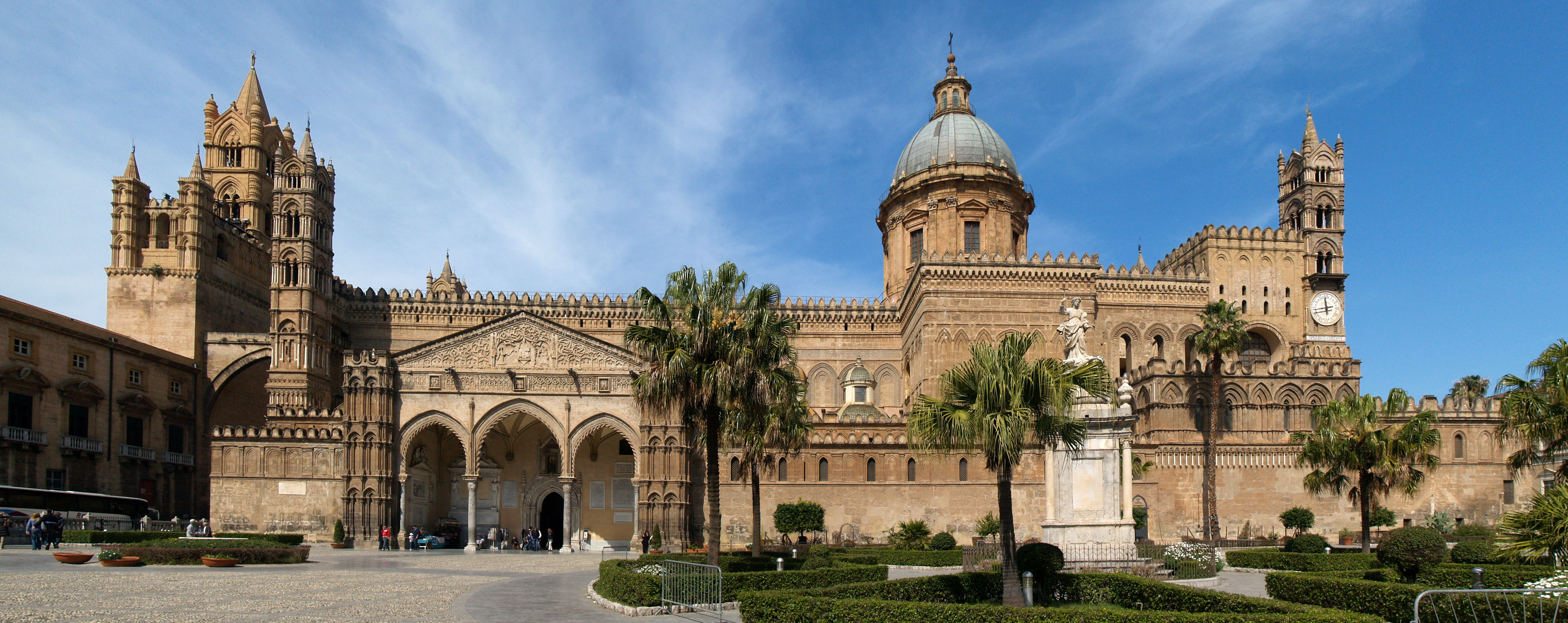
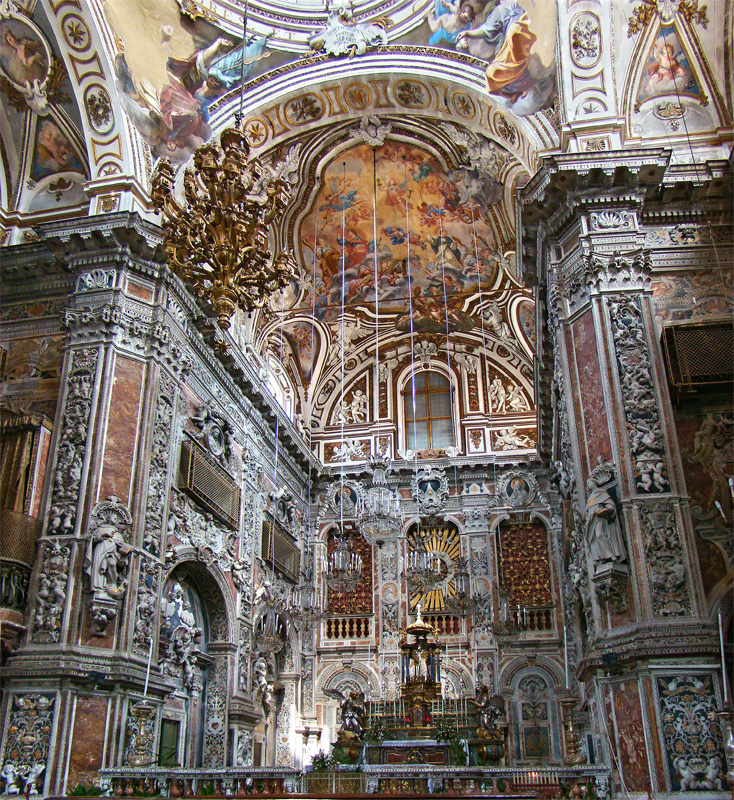
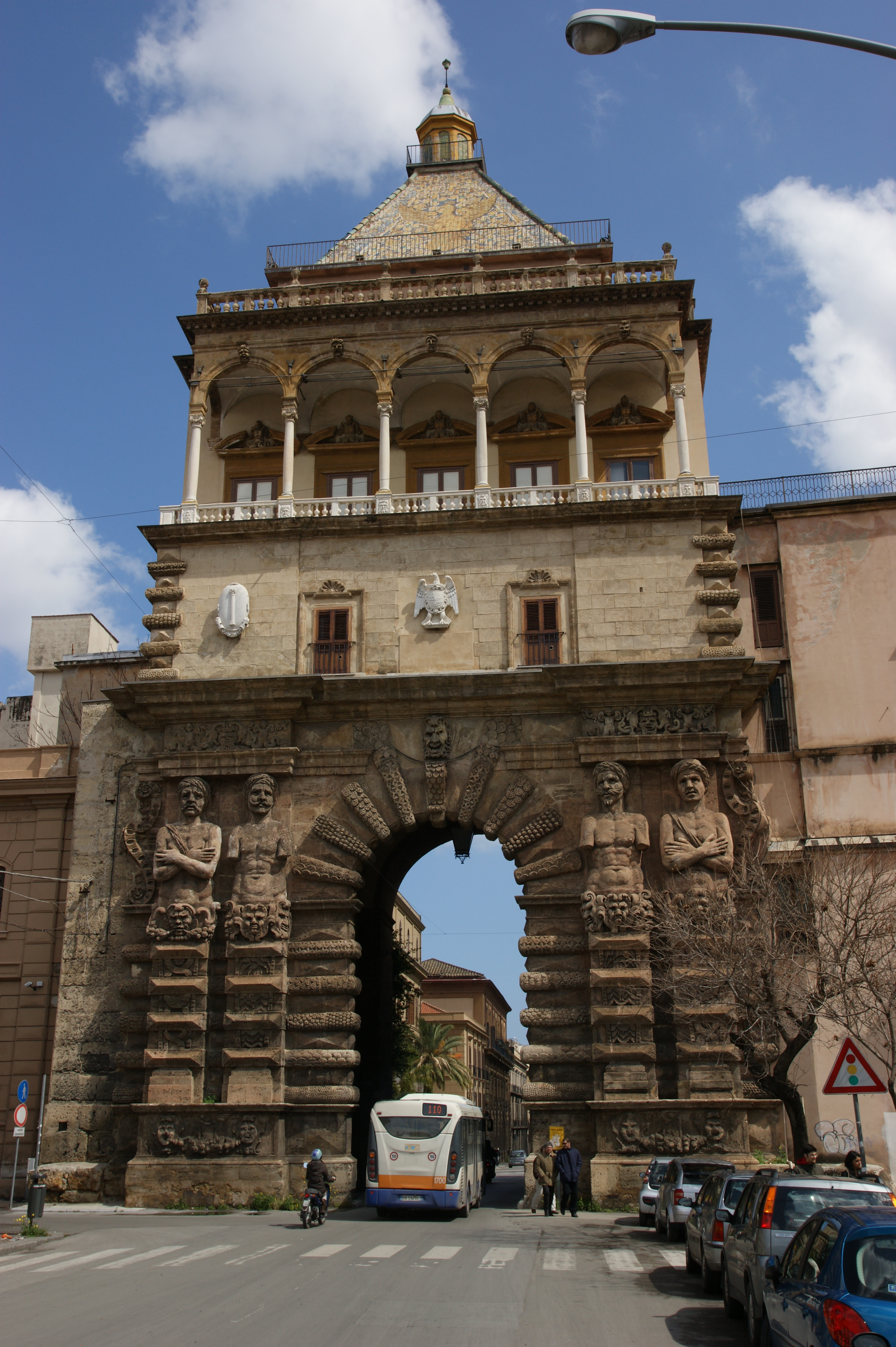
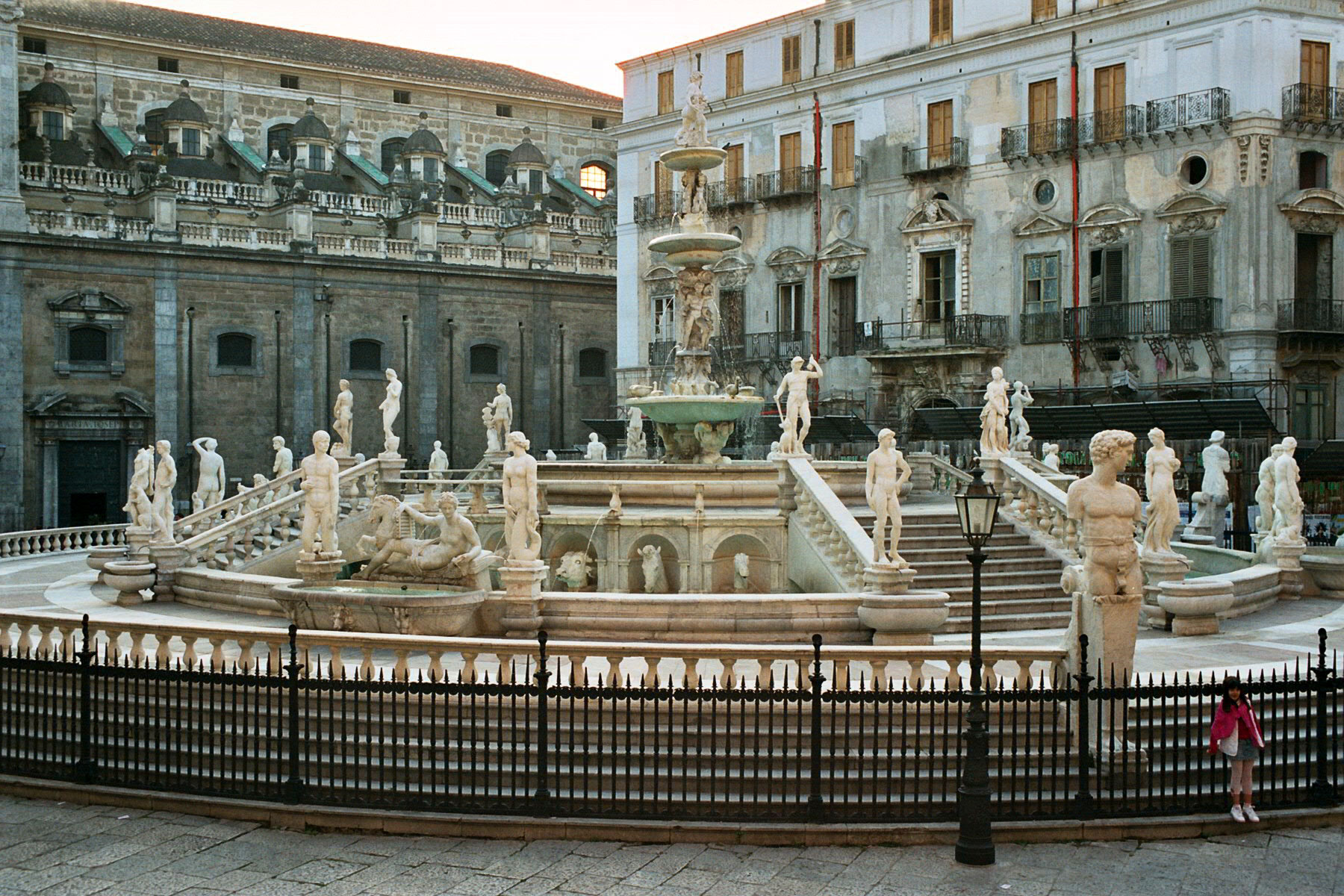
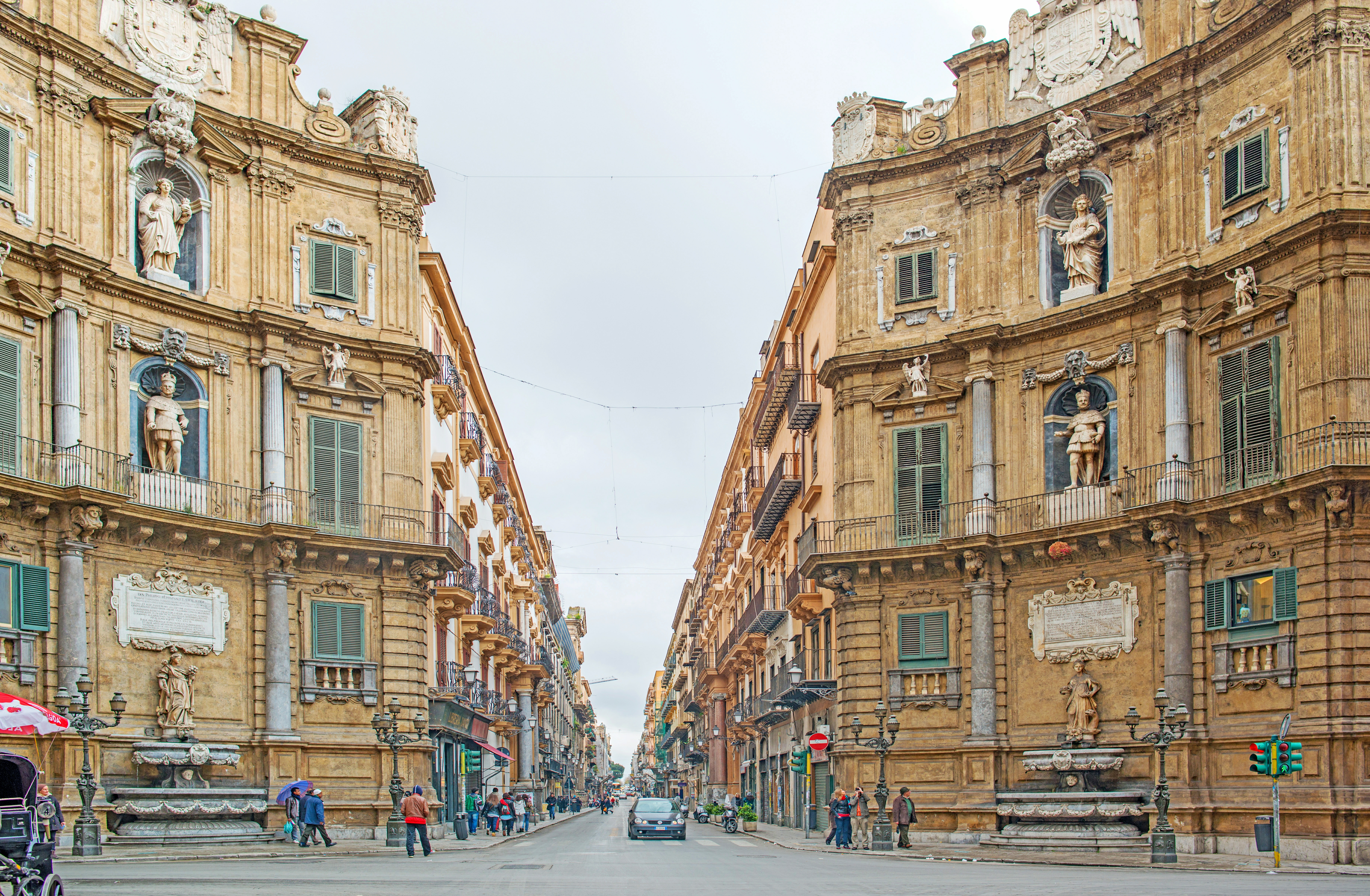
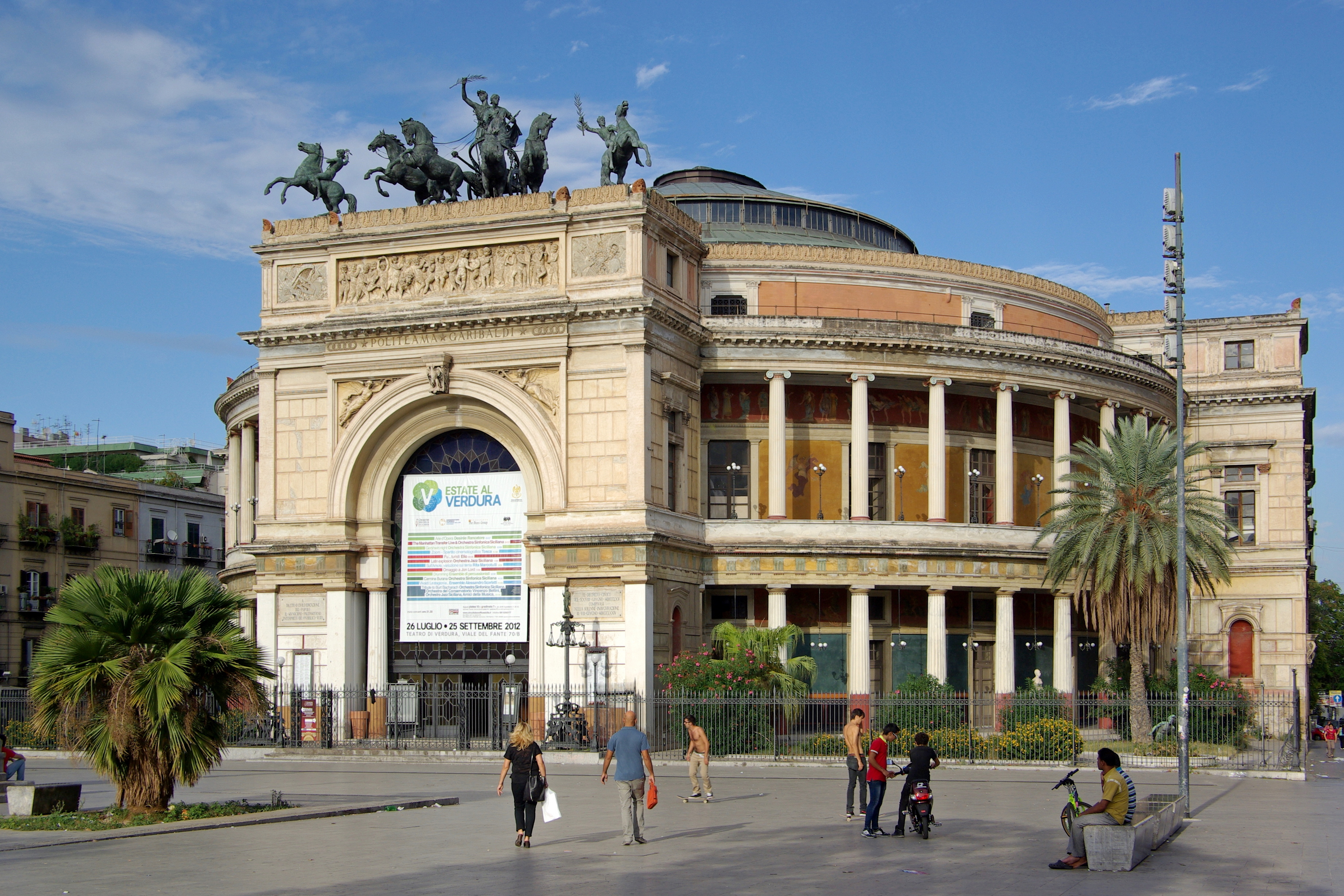
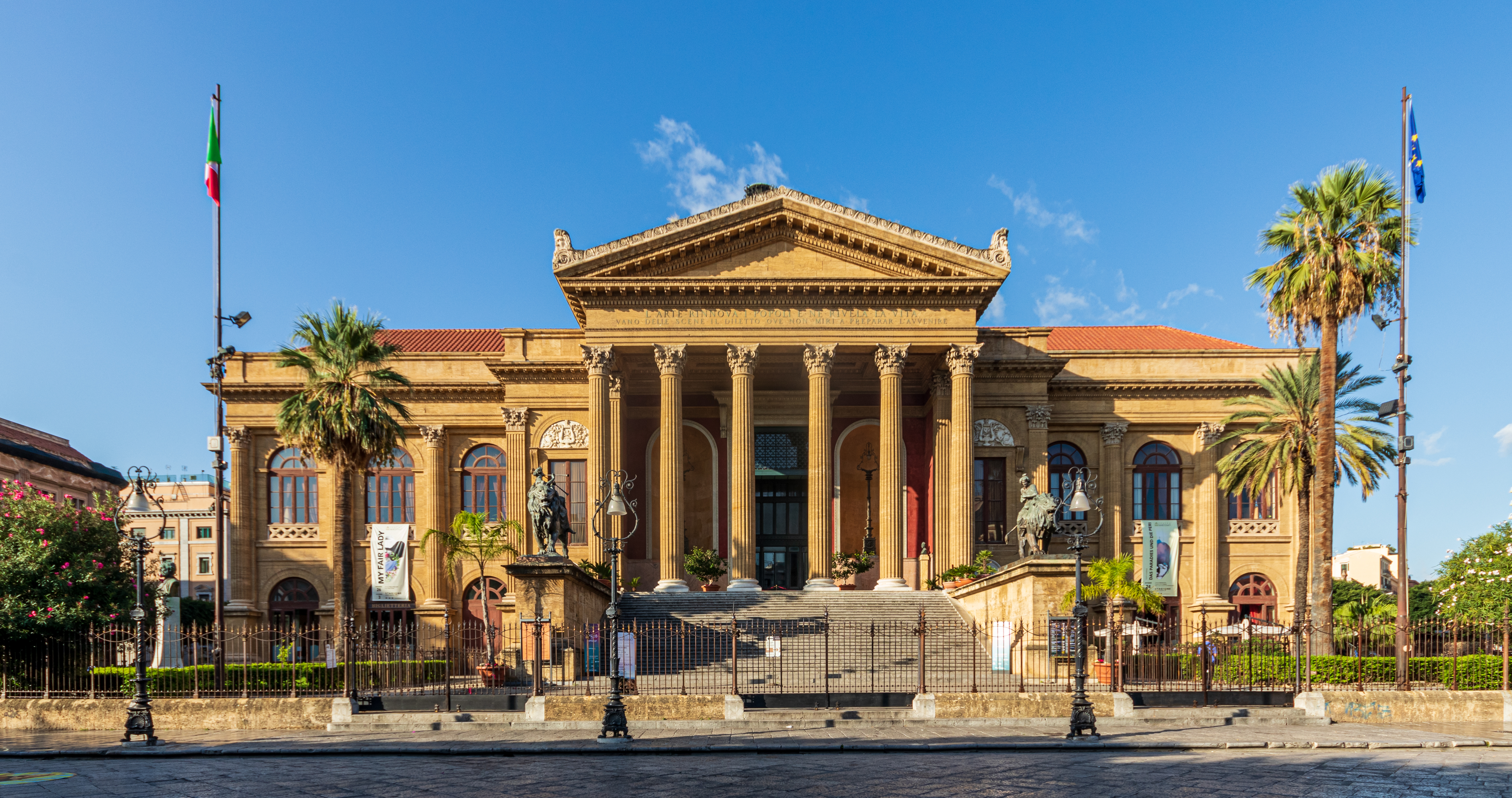
- Palermo Cathedral Interior of Santa Caterina Church Porta Nuova Fontana Pretoria Quattro Canti Teatro Politeama Teatro Massimo

- Flag Coat of arms
- Nickname: Conca d'oro (Golden Basin)
- Motto(s): Senatus Populusque Panormitanus Urbs Felix et Regni Caput (Latin for "The Senate and the People of Palermo, Happy City and Capital of the Kingdom")
- The municipality of Palermo within the Metropolitan City of Palermo
- Interactive map of Palermo
- Location within Italy Location within Sicily Location within Europe
- Coordinates: 38°06′40″N 13°21′06″E
- Country: Italy
- Region: Sicily
- Metropolitan city: Palermo (PA)
- Founded: 736 BC
- Frazioni: Monreale, Cinisi, Terrasini, Villabate

Government
  - Mayor: Roberto Lagalla (UDC)

Area
  - Total: 160.59 km^{2} (62.00 sq mi)
- Elevation: 14 m (46 ft)

Population (2026)
  - Total: 626,273 (5th in Italy)
  - Density: 3,899.8/km^{2} (10,101/sq mi)
- Demonyms: Palermitano; Panormito; Palermitan (English)
- Time zone: UTC+1 (CET)
  - Summer (DST): UTC+2 (CEST)
- Postal code: 90100
- Dialing code: 091
- ISTAT code: 082053
- Patron saint: Saint Rosalia, Saint Agata, Saint Oliva and Saint Benedict the Moor
- Saint day: 15 July
- Website: Official website

Palermo (Note: English: /pəˈlɛərmoʊ, -ˈlɜːr-/ pə-LAIR-moh, -LUR-; Italian: [paˈlɛrmo].) (Sicilian: Palermu) (Note: Locally also Paliemmu [paˈljɛmmʊ] or Palèimmu; Latin: Panormus, from Ancient Greek: Πάνορμος, romanized: Pánormos; older Arabic: بَلَرْم, romanized: Balarm.) is the capital and largest city of the autonomous island region of Sicily in southern Italy, located on the eponymous gulf facing the Tyrrhenian Sea. A 2,700-year-old city, it is noted for its history, culture, architecture and gastronomy, playing an important role throughout much of its existence.

Founded in 734 BC by the Phoenicians as Sis ("flower"), Palermo then became a possession of Carthage. Two Greek colonies were established, known collectively as Panormos; the Carthaginians used this name on their coins after the 5th century BC. As Panormus, the town became part of the Roman Republic and Empire for over a thousand years. From 831 to 1072 the city was under Arab rule in the Emirate of Sicily when the city became the capital of Sicily for the first time. During this time the city was known as Balarm. Following the Norman conquest, Palermo became the capital of a new kingdom, the Kingdom of Sicily, that lasted from 1130 to 1816.

The municipality of Palermo has a population of 626,273 as of 2026. The population of its urban area is estimated by Eurostat to be 855,285, while its metropolitan city is the 5th most populated in Italy, with around 1.2 million people. The inhabitants are known as Palermitani or, poetically, panormiti. The languages they speak are the Italian language and the Palermitano dialect of the Sicilian language.

Palermo is Sicily's cultural, economic and tourism capital. It is a city rich in history, culture, art, music and food. Many tourists are attracted by the Mediterranean climate, renowned gastronomy and restaurants, Romanesque, Gothic, Baroque and Art Nouveau churches, palaces and buildings, and the nightlife and music. Palermo is the main Sicilian industrial and commercial center: the main industrial sectors include tourism, services, commerce and agriculture. Palermo has an international airport and a significant underground economy. For cultural, artistic and economic reasons, Palermo is one of the largest cities in the Mediterranean and among the top tourist destinations in both Italy and Europe. It is the main seat of the UNESCO World Heritage Site Arab-Norman Palermo and the Cathedral Churches of Cefalù and Monreale. The city is also undergoing careful redevelopment, preparing to become one of the major cities of the Euro-Mediterranean area.

Roman Catholicism is highly important in Palermitan culture. The Patron Saint of Palermo is Santa Rosalia, whose Feast Day is celebrated on 15 July. The area attracts significant numbers of tourists and is widely known for its colourful fruit, vegetable and fish markets at the heart of Palermo, known as Vucciria, Ballarò and Capo.

== History ==
=== Early history ===
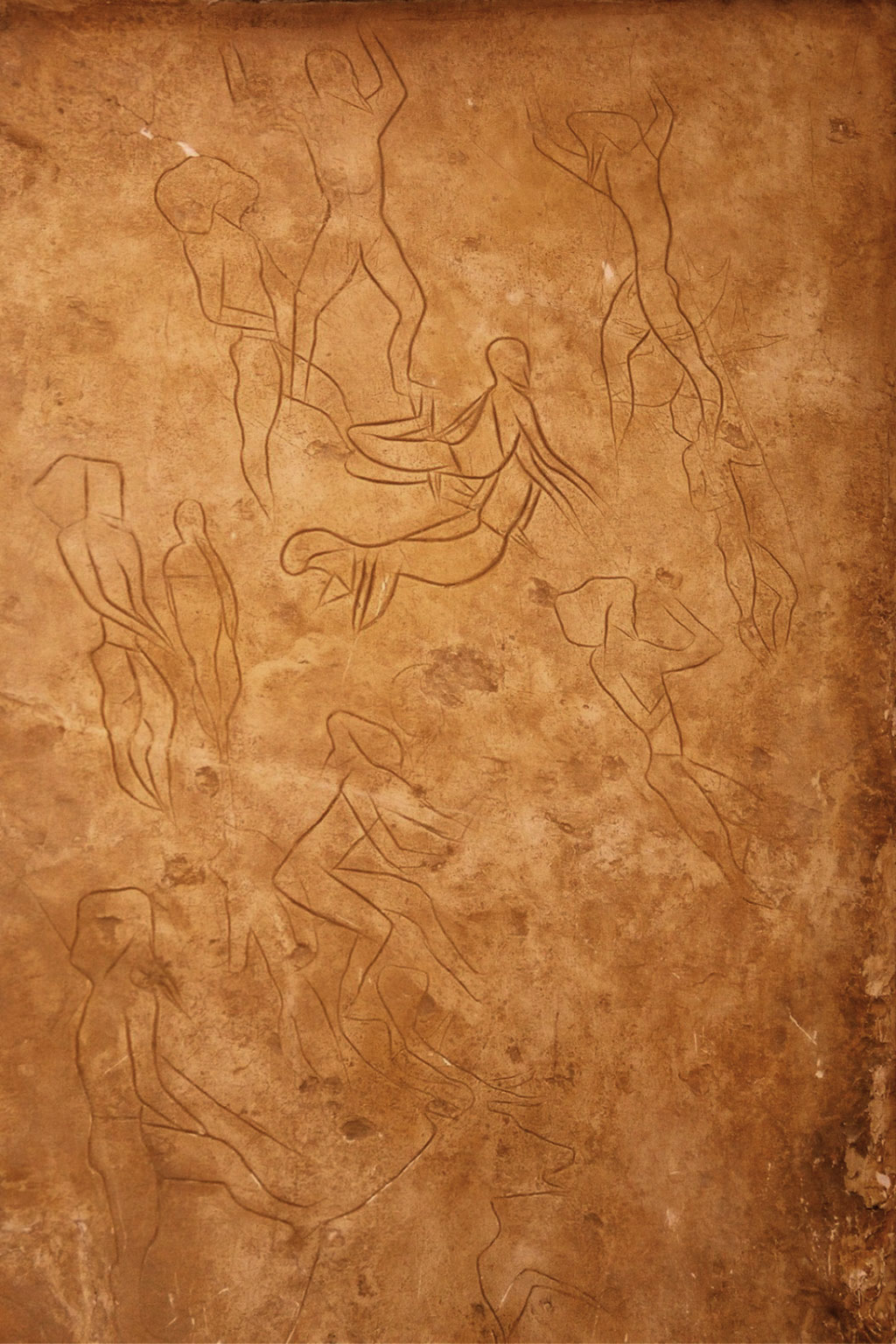
Mesolithic cave art at Addaura

Evidence of human settlement in the area now known as Palermo goes back to at least the Mesolithic period, perhaps around 8000 BC, where a group of cave drawings at nearby Addaura from that period have been found. The original inhabitants were Sicani people who, according to Thucydides, arrived from the Iberian Peninsula (perhaps Catalonia).

=== Antiquity ===
In the 8th c. BC the Phoenicians built a small settlement on the natural harbour of Palermo, which became known as Ziz (Punic: 𐤑𐤉𐤑, ṣyṣ). It became one of the three main Phoenician colonies of Sicily, along with Motya and Soluntum.

The first settlement was later known as Paleapolis meaning "Old City". The site chosen by the Phoenicians was connected to the mountains with two roads that today have become Via Cappuccini and Corso Pisani.

The Neapolis or "New City", the nucleus of the subsequent expansion of the colony, soon developed in the area between the Paleapolis and the port. The new district expanded rapidly, exceeding the size of the old quarter, and soon became the site of markets, artisan and commercial activities. The walls were extended to embrace the new urban perimeter and two new gates were made, while the old gate at the port was moved to make room for the new buildings. In total there were 4 gates, one on each side of the city. The walls followed the course of the two rivers that surround the city, the Kemonia and the Papireto, creating a natural moat and improving the military security of the city. During the Roman era they were reinforced.

The Cassaro district was probably named after the walls themselves; the word Cassaro deriving from the Arab al-qaṣr (castle, stronghold, see also alcázar). The colony developed around a central street (decumanus) now the Corso Vittorio Emanuele.

Carthage was Palermo's major trading partner under the Phoenicians and the city enjoyed a prolonged peace during this period. Palermo came into contact with the Ancient Greeks between the 6th and the 5th centuries BC which preceded the Sicilian Wars, a conflict fought between the Greeks of Syracuse and the Carthaginians for control over the island of Sicily. During this war the Greeks named the settlement Pánormos or 'wide haven' due to its large anchorage, from which the present name of the city developed. The Carthaginians began using the Greek name on the city's coinage from the 5th century BC. It was from Palermo that Hamilcar I's fleet (which was defeated at the Battle of Himera) was launched. In 409 BC the city was looted by Hermocrates of Syracuse. The Sicilian Wars ended in 265 BC when Syracuse allied with the Romans of Italy and pushed the Carthaginians off of the island during the First Punic War. In 276 BC, during the Pyrrhic War, Panormos briefly became a Greek colony after being conquered by Pyrrhus of Epirus, but returned to Punic Carthage in 275 BC. In 254 BC Panormos was besieged and conquered by the Romans. Carthage attempted to reconquer Panormus in the Battle of Panormus 250 BC but failed.

In Roman times luxurious residences were built and have been found in several locations (piazza Sett'Angeli, Palazzo Sclafani, piazza della Vittoria).

=== Middle Ages ===
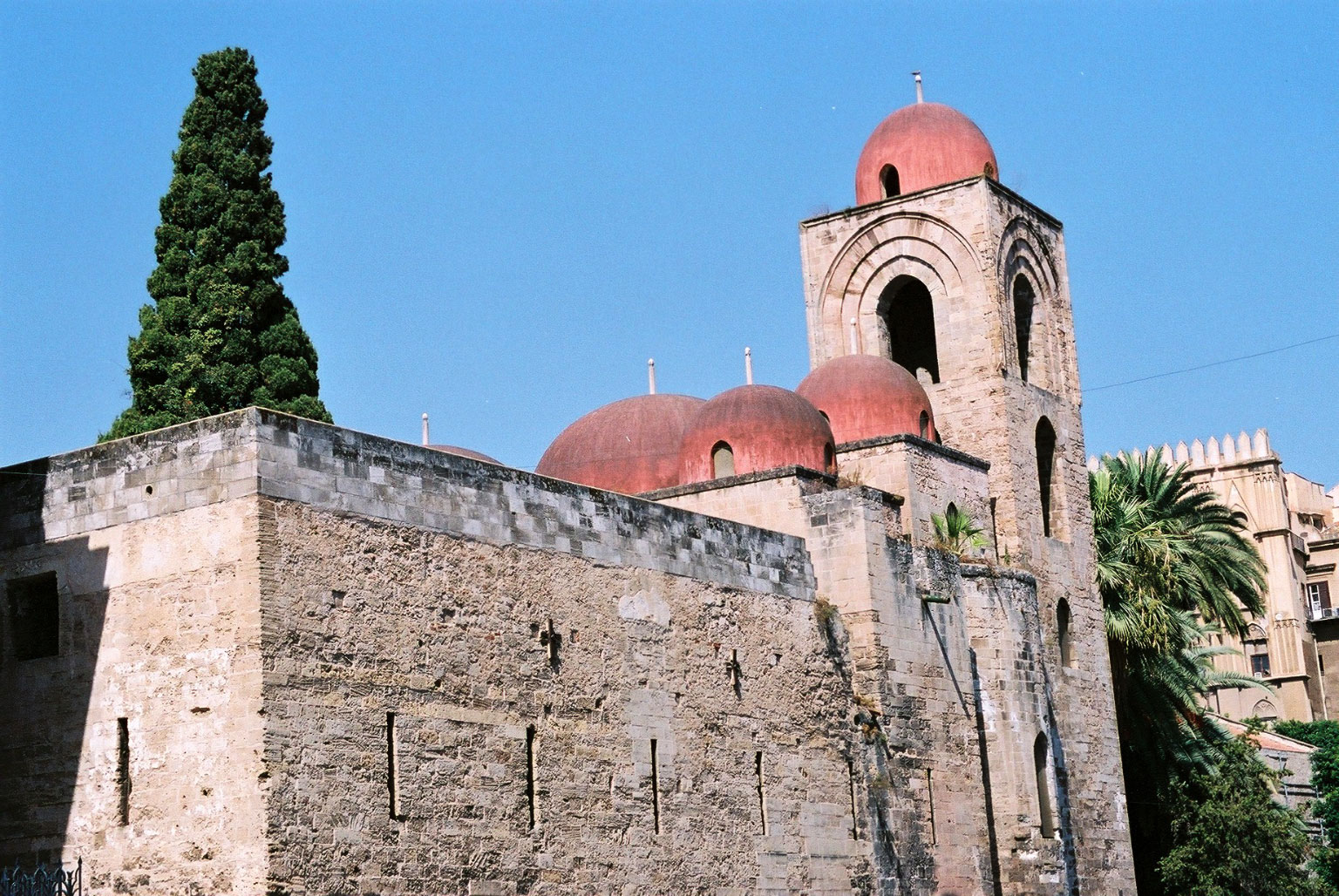
San Giovanni degli Eremiti, a church showing elements of Byzantine, Arabic, and Norman architecture

As the Roman Empire was falling apart, Palermo fell under the control of several Germanic tribes. The first were the Vandals in 440 AD under the rule of their king Geiseric. The Vandals had occupied all the Roman provinces in North Africa by 455 establishing themselves as a significant force. They acquired Corsica, Sardinia and Sicily shortly afterwards. However, they soon lost these newly acquired possessions to the Ostrogoths. The Ostrogothic conquest under Theodoric the Great began in 488; Theodoric supported Roman culture and government unlike the Germanic Goths. The Gothic War took place between the Ostrogoths and the Eastern Roman Empire, also known as the Byzantine Empire. Sicily was the first part of Italy to be taken under control of General Belisarius who was commissioned by the Eastern Emperor. In late 535 his Byzantine army of 7,500–9,000 and a fleet laid siege to the city in the Siege of Panormus, which had refused to surrender unlike all the other Ostrogothic-held cities in Sicily, and eventually prevailed.

Justinian I solidified his rule in the following years.

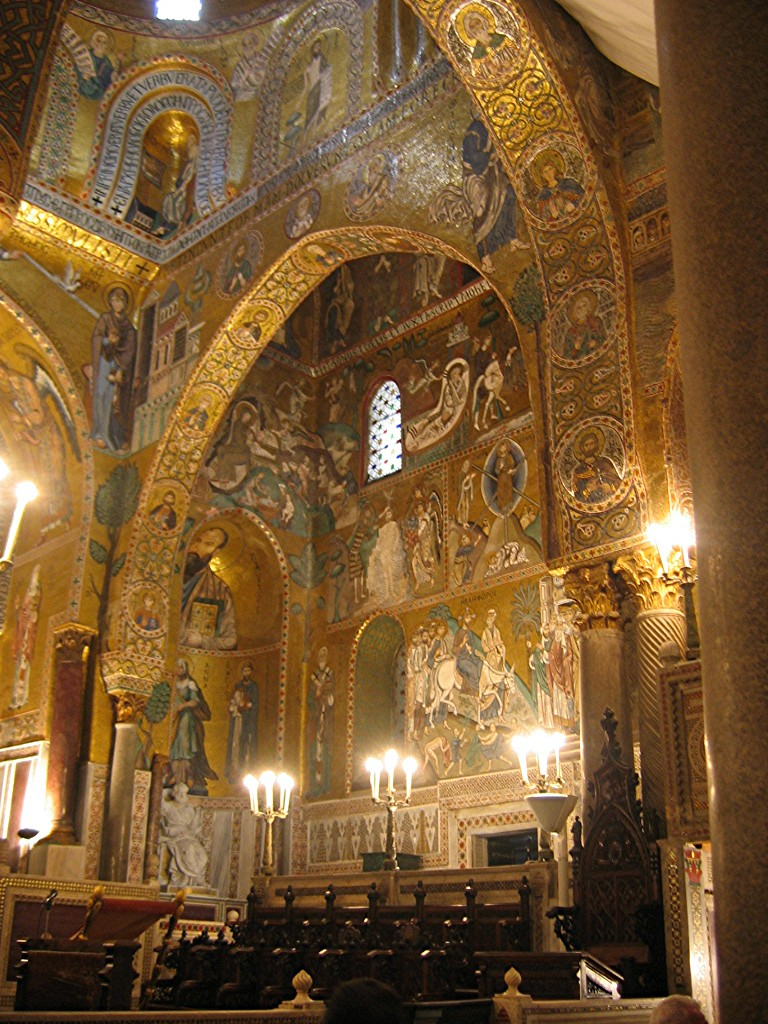
Cappella Palatina, decorated with Byzantine, Arabic and Norman elements

The Arabs took control of Palermo and most of Sicily in 831, and the Emirate of Sicily was established, though other cities persisted as Byzantine holdouts until as late as 965. Muslim rule in Palermo lasted for about 240 years. Palermo (Bal'harm during Arab rule) displaced Syracuse as the capital of Sicily. It was said to have then begun to compete with Córdoba and Cairo in terms of importance and splendor. For more than a hundred years Palermo was the capital of a flourishing emirate. The Arabs also introduced many agricultural crops which remain a mainstay of Sicilian cuisine.

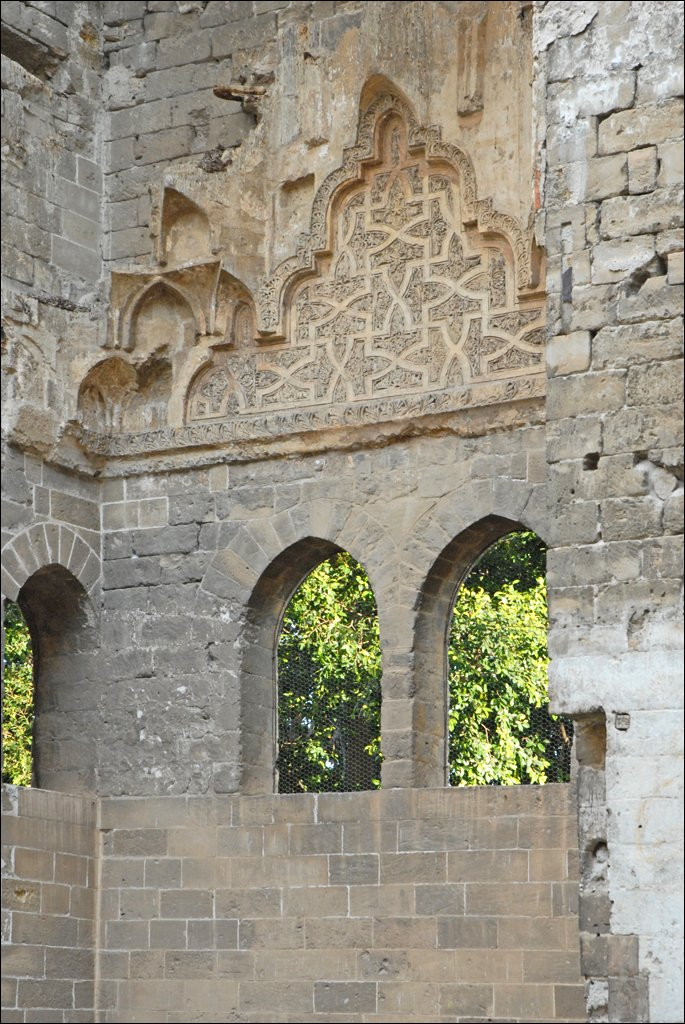
Arabesque on a wall of the Cuba Palace

After dynastic quarrels however, there was a Norman conquest in 1072. Normans conquered Palermo after a long siege. Indeed, the feat proved difficult because the Normans had never besieged such a populous city with such powerful walls. After 5 months siege, Normans built numerous stairs and war machines and finally conquered the city. The family who returned the city to Christianity were called the Hautevilles, including Robert Guiscard and his army, who is regarded as a hero by the natives. It was under his nephew Roger II of Sicily that Norman holdings in Sicily and the southern part of the Italian Peninsula were promoted from the County of Sicily into the Kingdom of Sicily. The kingdom's capital was Palermo, with the King's Court held at the Palazzo dei Normanni. Much construction was undertaken during this period, such as the building of Palermo Cathedral. The Kingdom of Sicily became one of the wealthiest states in Europe.

Thanks to the marriage between Constance, Queen of Sicily, and Henry VI, Holy Roman Emperor, Palermo and the whole Sicily was inherited by their son Frederick II, who became King of Sicily in 1198 and Holy Roman Emperor in 1220. Palermo was the capital of Emperor Frederick II's vast empire and also his favorite city. Muslims of Palermo emigrated or were expelled during Frederick's rule. After an interval of Angevin rule (1266–1282), Sicily came under control of the Aragon and Barcelona dynasties. By 1330, Palermo's population had declined to 51,000.

=== Early modern era ===
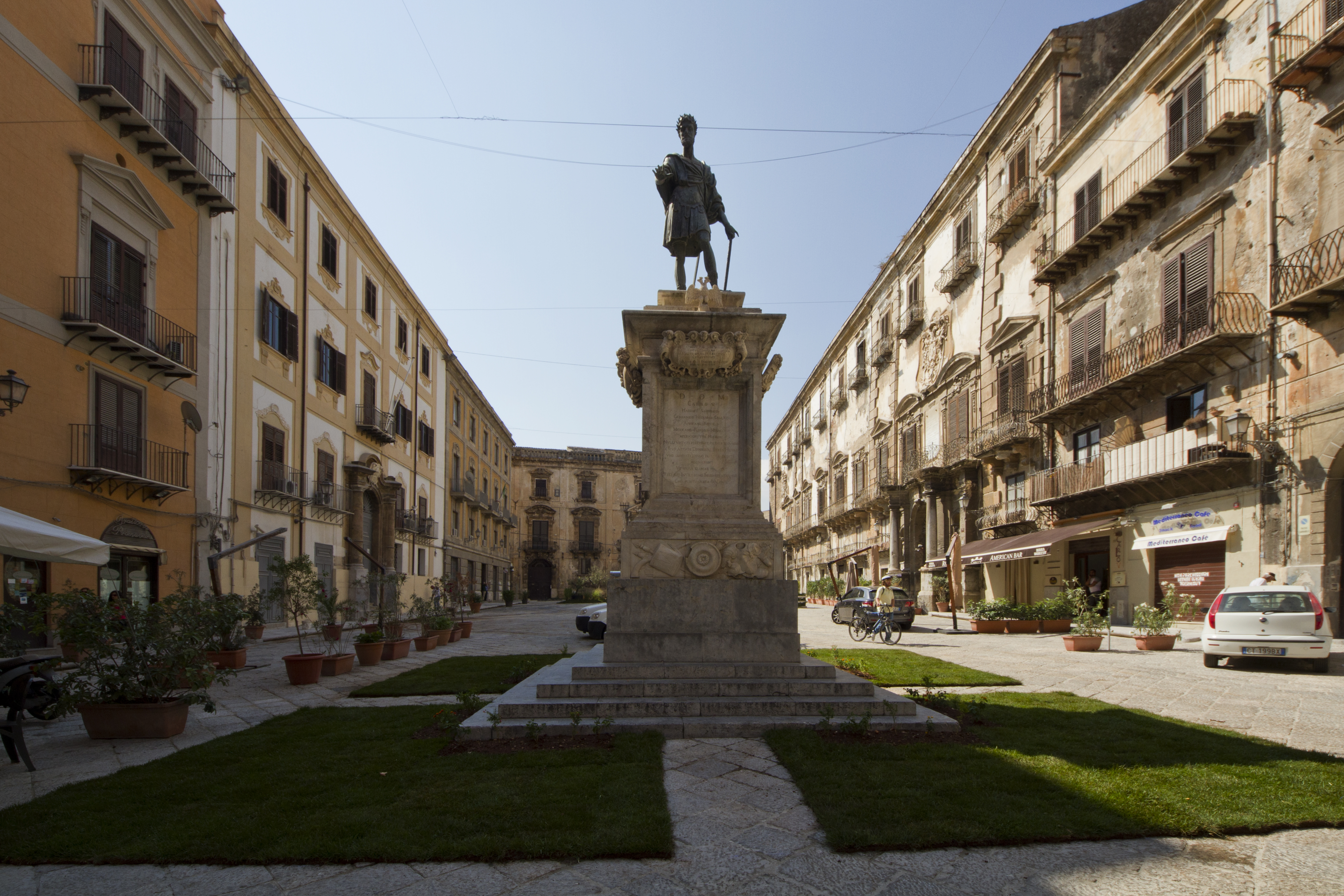
Charles V Monument (1631) commemorating the monarch's visit in Palermo in 1535

From 1479 until 1713 Palermo was ruled by the Kingdom of Spain, and again between 1717 and 1718. Palermo was also under Savoy control between 1713 and 1717 and 1718–1720 as a result of the Treaty of Utrecht. It was ruled by Austria between 1720 and 1734.

=== Two Sicilies ===
After the Treaty of Utrecht (1713), Sicily was handed over to the House of Savoy, but by 1734 it was in Bourbon possession. Charles III chose Palermo for his coronation as King of Sicily. Charles had new houses built for the growing population, while trade and industry grew as well. However, Palermo had become just another provincial city as the Royal Court resided in Naples. Charles' son Ferdinand, though disliked by the population, took refuge in Palermo after the French Revolution in 1798. His son Alberto died on the way to Palermo and is buried in the city.

When the Kingdom of the Two Sicilies was founded, the original capital city was Palermo (1816) but a year later moved to Naples.

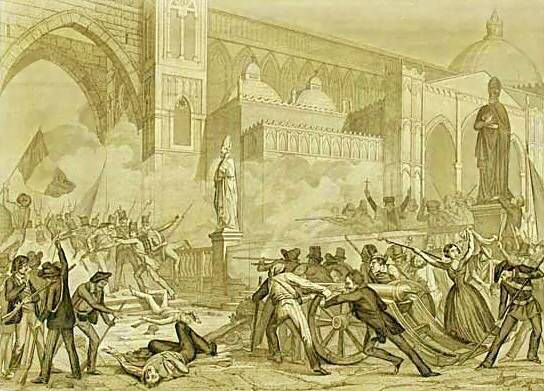
The revolution in Palermo (12 January 1848)

From 1820 to 1848 Sicily was shaken by upheavals, which culminated on 12 January 1848, with a popular insurrection, the first one in Europe that year, led by Giuseppe La Masa. A parliament and constitution were proclaimed. The first president was Ruggero Settimo. The Bourbons reconquered Palermo in 1849, and it remained under their rule until the Expedition of the Thousand, led by Giuseppe Garibaldi, conquered the city after the Siege of Palermo in May 1860. After the plebiscite later that year Palermo, along with the rest of Sicily, became part of the new Kingdom of Italy (1861).

=== Italian unification ===
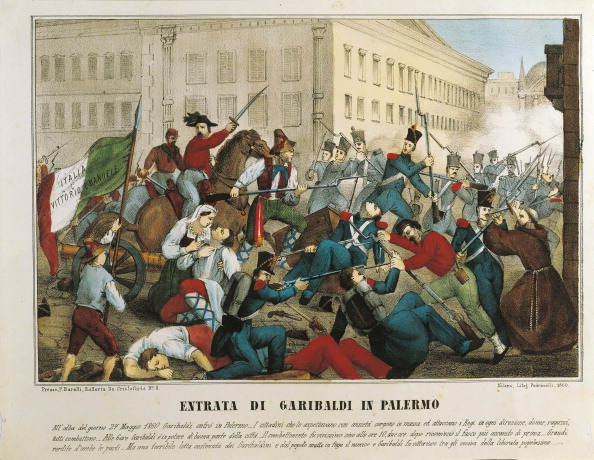
Giuseppe Garibaldi entering Palermo on 27 May 1860

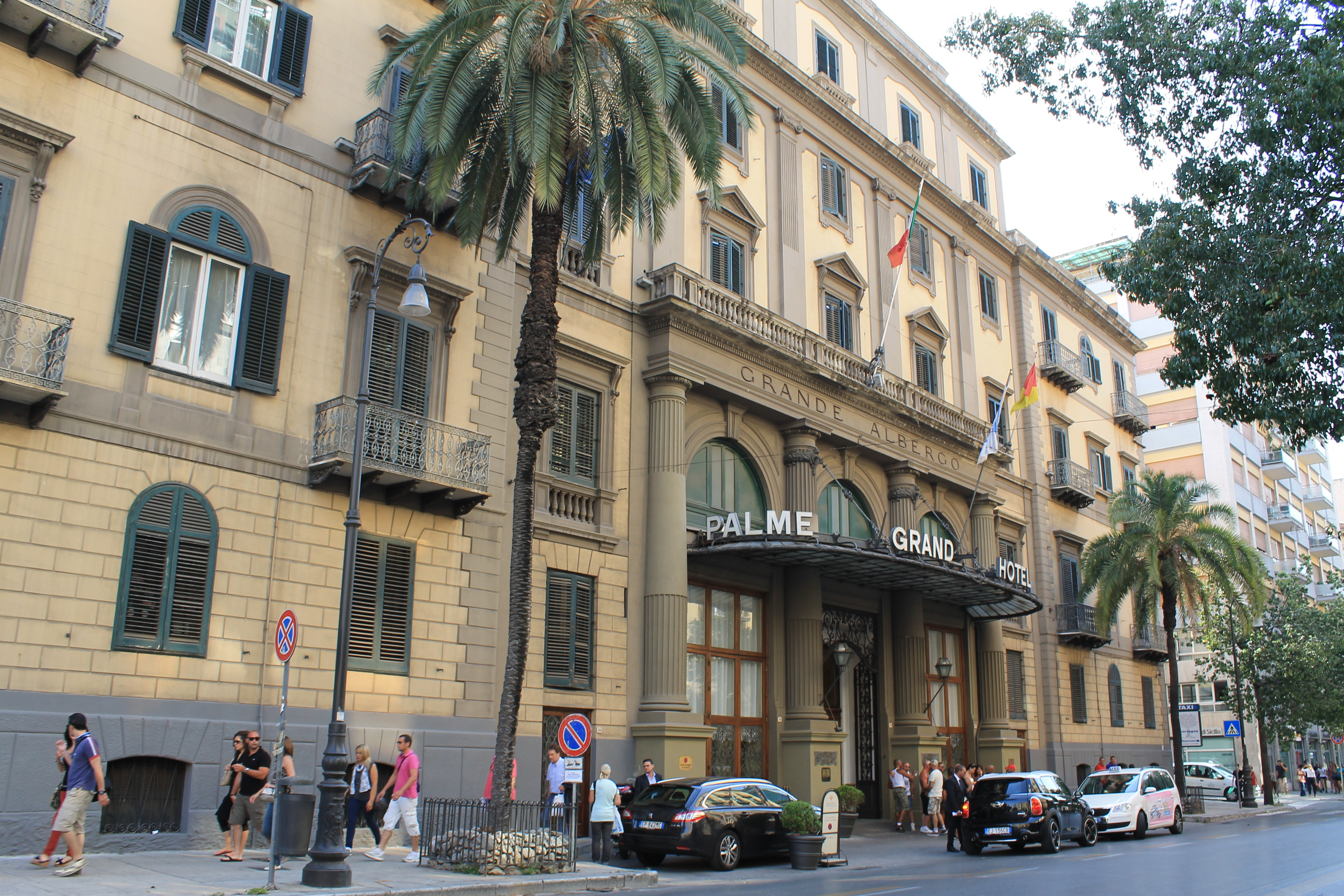
The historic Grand Hotel et des Palmes

The majority of Sicilians preferred independence to annexation by the Savoy kingdom; in 1866, Palermo became the seat of a week-long popular rebellion, which was finally crushed after martial law was declared. The Italian government blamed anarchists and the Church, specifically the Archbishop of Palermo, for the rebellion and began enacting anti-Sicilian and anti-clerical policies. A new cultural, economic and industrial growth was spurred by several families, like the Florio, the Ducrot, the Rutelli, the Sandron, the Whitaker, the Utveggio, and others. In the early twentieth century, Palermo expanded outside the old city walls, mostly to the north along the new boulevards Via Roma, Via Dante, Via Notarbartolo, and Viale della Libertà. These roads soon had a huge number of villas in the Art Nouveau style. Many of these were designed by the architect Ernesto Basile. The Grand Hotel Villa Igiea, designed by Basile for the Florio family, is a good example of Palermitan Art Nouveau. The huge Teatro Massimo was designed in the same period by Giovan Battista Filippo Basile, Ernesto's father, and built by the Rutelli & Machì building firm of the industrial and old Rutelli Italian family in Palermo. It opened in 1897.

=== World War II ===
During the Second World War, Palermo was heavily bombed by the Allied air forces in 1942 and 1943 until its capture during the Allied invasion of Sicily on 22 July 1943. The harbour and the surrounding quarters were effectively destroyed, as was much of the city, with heavy civilian casualties. When U.S. troops entered Palermo in 1943 they were greeted with "a thunderous welcome by what seemed the entire population demonstrating their feelings about Fascist rule." The two captured Italian generals claimed that they were happy because in their view "the Sicilians were not human beings but animals". Anti-Sicilian prejudice was part of the fascist regime's worldview, promoted by pro-fascist newspapers, particularly in the north of Italy.

=== Italian Republic and today ===
In 1946, the city was declared the seat of the Regional Parliament, as capital of a Special Status Region (1947) whose seat is in the Palazzo dei Normanni.

In 1948, the element technetium was discovered in the University of Palermo.

A theme in the city's modern age has been the struggle against the Sicilian Mafia, Red Brigades and outlaws such as Salvatore Giuliano, who controlled the neighbouring area of Montelepre. The Italian state effectively has had to share control of the territory, economically and administratively, with the Mafia.

The "Sack of Palermo" was one of the dramatic consequences of this problem. This popular term refers to the speculative building practices that resulted in the destruction of a great number of historical buildings and green areas in favour of poor buildings, mainly between the 1950s and the 1980s. The reduced importance of agriculture in the Sicilian economy has led to massive migration to the cities, especially Palermo, which swelled in size, leading to rapid northward expansion. The regulatory plans for expansion were largely ignored in the boom. New parts of town appeared almost out of nowhere, but without parks, schools, public buildings, proper roads, or the other amenities that characterise a modern city.

The Cosa Nostra has traditionally been the most powerful group in Palermo. A 2019 CNN article reported that Sicilian Mafia activity in Palermo was particularly notorious in one area, Passo Rigano. "According to Italian police, the Mafia not only engages in extortion there, but also has a large role in the town's legal economy—with its involvement in business such as wholesale food supplies, online betting and gambling." The police investigation at the time also confirmed strong links between the Palermo area mafia and American organized crime, particularly the Gambino crime family. According to La Repubblica, "Off they go, through the streets of Passo di Rigano, Boccadifalco, Torretta and at the same time, Brooklyn, Staten Island, New Jersey. Because from Sicily to the US, the old mafia has returned".

== Geography ==
Palermo lies in a basin formed by the Papireto, Kemonia and Oreto rivers. The basin was named the Conca d'Oro (the Golden Basin) by the Arabs in the 9th century. The city is surrounded by a mountain range named after the city. These mountains face the Tyrrhenian Sea. Palermo is home to a natural port and offers views of the sea, especially from Monte Pellegrino.

=== Climate ===
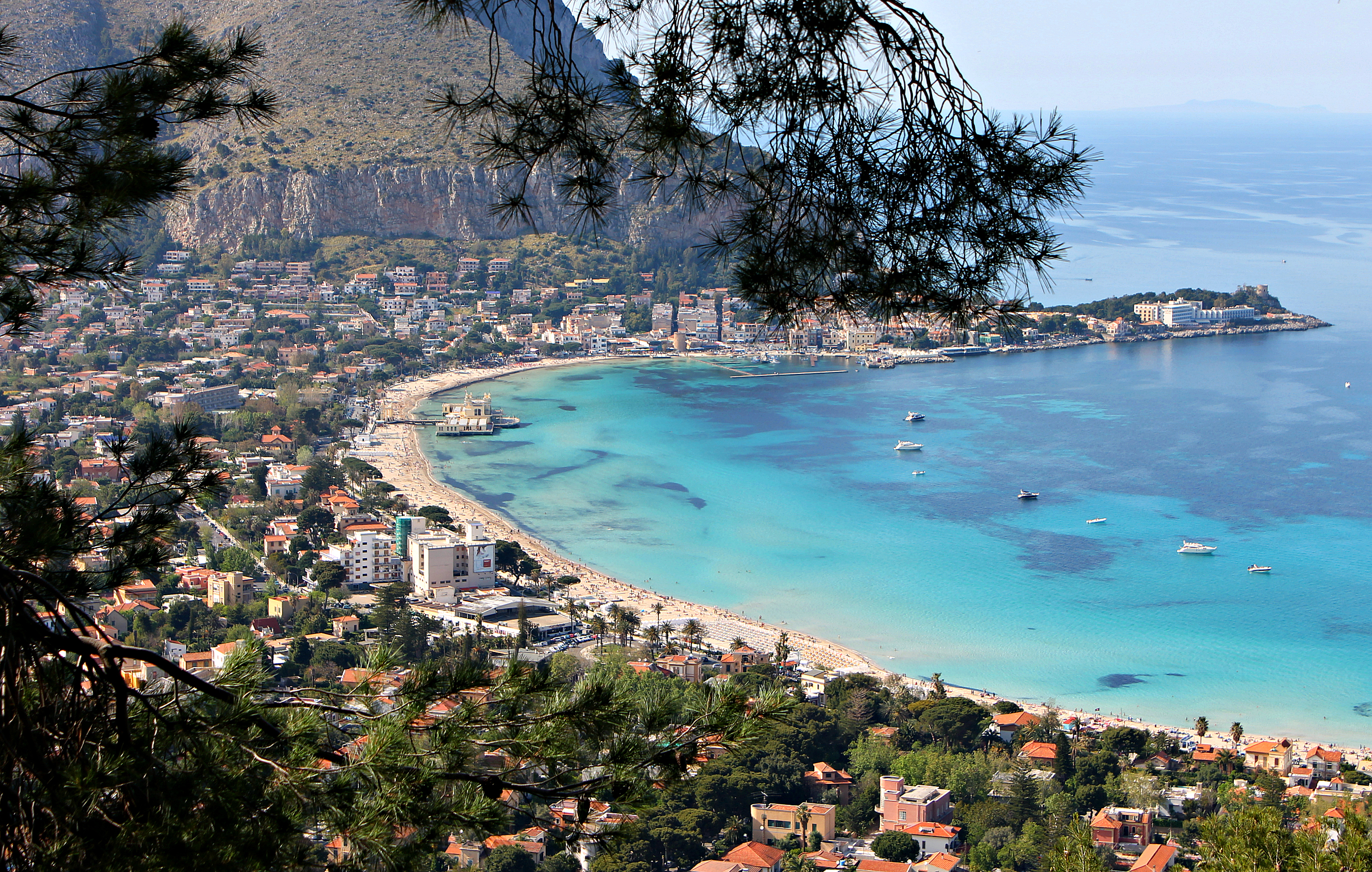
Gulf of Mondello seen from Monte Pellegrino

Palermo experiences a hot-summer subtropical Mediterranean climate (Köppen climate classification: Csa) with moderate seasonality. Summers are very long, hot and dry due to the domination of subtropical high pressure system, while winters are mild and changeable, with rainy weather due to the polar front. Temperatures in autumn and spring are typically warm. Palermo is one of the warmest cities in Europe (mainly due to its warm nights), with an average annual air temperature of 18 °C (64 °F); it is one of Italy's warmest cities. It receives about 2,530 hours of sunshine per year. Snow is rare, having occurred about a dozen times since 1945. Since the 1940s, considerable snowfall has occurred at least five times. In 1949 and in 1956, when the minimum temperature went down to 0 °C (32 °F), the city was blanketed by centimetres of snow. Snowfall also occurred in 1981, 1986, 1999 and 2014. The lowest temperature ever recorded in Palermo was −2.5 °C (27 °F) in February 1967. The average annual temperature of the sea is above 19 °C (66 °F); from 14 °C (57 °F) in February to 26 °C (79 °F) in August. From November to May, the average sea temperature exceeds 18 °C (64 °F) and from June to October, the average sea temperature exceeds 21 °C (70 °F).

Climate data for Palermo-Boccadifalco Airport on the outskirts of the city (altitude: 117 m, satellite view), 1991–2020 normals, Extremes 1923–present
Month	Jan	Feb	Mar	Apr	May	Jun	Jul	Aug	Sep	Oct	Nov	Dec	Year
Record high °C (°F)	27.2 (81.0)	29.2 (84.6)	34.6 (94.3)	37.4 (99.3)	39.4 (102.9)	44.0 (111.2)	45.4 (113.7)	45.2 (113.4)	41.6 (106.9)	37.6 (99.7)	30.6 (87.1)	26.7 (80.1)	45.4 (113.7)
Mean daily maximum °C (°F)	15.1 (59.2)	15.3 (59.5)	16.7 (62.1)	19.8 (67.6)	24.0 (75.2)	28.1 (82.6)	30.9 (87.6)	31.4 (88.5)	27.9 (82.2)	24.3 (75.7)	19.8 (67.6)	16.3 (61.3)	22.5 (72.4)
Daily mean °C (°F)	12.1 (53.8)	12.1 (53.8)	13.7 (56.7)	16.0 (60.8)	19.9 (67.8)	23.9 (75.0)	26.7 (80.1)	27.3 (81.1)	24.2 (75.6)	20.9 (69.6)	16.7 (62.1)	13.4 (56.1)	18.9 (66.0)
Mean daily minimum °C (°F)	9.2 (48.6)	8.9 (48.0)	10.1 (50.2)	12.2 (54.0)	15.8 (60.4)	19.7 (67.5)	22.5 (72.5)	23.1 (73.6)	20.5 (68.9)	17.5 (63.5)	13.6 (56.5)	10.5 (50.9)	15.3 (59.5)
Record low °C (°F)	−1.2 (29.8)	0 (32)	−0.3 (31.5)	4.6 (40.3)	8.0 (46.4)	11 (52)	14.8 (58.6)	13.1 (55.6)	10.6 (51.1)	7.2 (45.0)	3.6 (38.5)	0.8 (33.4)	−1.2 (29.8)
Average precipitation mm (inches)	71.4 (2.81)	64.9 (2.56)	59.4 (2.34)	44.2 (1.74)	25.6 (1.01)	12.2 (0.48)	5.1 (0.20)	13.4 (0.53)	41.6 (1.64)	77.2 (3.04)	94.3 (3.71)	81.3 (3.20)	590.6 (23.26)
Average precipitation days	9.3	8.8	7.7	6.4	3.7	1.6	0.7	1.8	4.7	7.8	9.4	10.1	72
Source 1: Servizio Meteorologico
Source 2: Tu Tiempo Extreme temperatures.

Climate data for Palermo-Valverde, elevation: 21 m or 69 ft, 1961–1990 normals, Extremes 1960–1990
Month	Jan	Feb	Mar	Apr	May	Jun	Jul	Aug	Sep	Oct	Nov	Dec	Year
Mean daily maximum °C (°F)	15.4 (59.7)	15.9 (60.6)	17.5 (63.5)	20.1 (68.2)	23.4 (74.1)	27.2 (81.0)	30.1 (86.2)	30.4 (86.7)	28.3 (82.9)	24.5 (76.1)	20.6 (69.1)	16.9 (62.4)	22.5 (72.5)
Daily mean °C (°F)	11.1 (52.0)	11.5 (52.7)	12.7 (54.9)	15.1 (59.2)	18.2 (64.8)	21.9 (71.4)	24.6 (76.3)	25.0 (77.0)	23.1 (73.6)	19.7 (67.5)	15.9 (60.6)	12.6 (54.7)	17.6 (63.7)
Mean daily minimum °C (°F)	6.8 (44.2)	7.0 (44.6)	8.0 (46.4)	10.1 (50.2)	12.9 (55.2)	16.6 (61.9)	19.0 (66.2)	19.6 (67.3)	17.9 (64.2)	14.8 (58.6)	11.3 (52.3)	8.4 (47.1)	12.7 (54.9)
Average precipitation mm (inches)	89 (3.5)	69 (2.7)	58 (2.3)	46 (1.8)	25 (1.0)	10 (0.4)	5 (0.2)	12 (0.5)	42 (1.7)	80 (3.1)	84 (3.3)	93 (3.7)	613 (24.2)
Average precipitation days	12	9	9	7	4	2	1	1	5	8	10	12	80
Source: Servizio Meteorologico

Climate data for Cinisi, at 30 km (19 mi) from Palermo. (Palermo Punta Raisi Airport), elevation: 21 m or 69 ft, 1961–1990 normals, Extremes 1960–1990
Month	Jan	Feb	Mar	Apr	May	Jun	Jul	Aug	Sep	Oct	Nov	Dec	Year
Record high °C (°F)	25.6 (78.1)	29.4 (84.9)	34.7 (94.5)	34.6 (94.3)	40.0 (104.0)	44.2 (111.6)	43.1 (109.6)	42.4 (108.3)	40.6 (105.1)	35.2 (95.4)	31 (88)	26.7 (80.1)	44.2 (111.6)
Mean daily maximum °C (°F)	14.8 (58.6)	15.1 (59.2)	16.1 (61.0)	18.4 (65.1)	21.8 (71.2)	25.1 (77.2)	28.3 (82.9)	28.8 (83.8)	26.6 (79.9)	22.9 (73.2)	19.3 (66.7)	16.0 (60.8)	21.1 (70.0)
Daily mean °C (°F)	12.5 (54.5)	12.6 (54.7)	13.5 (56.3)	15.7 (60.3)	18.9 (66.0)	22.4 (72.3)	25.6 (78.1)	26.2 (79.2)	24.1 (75.4)	20.3 (68.5)	16.8 (62.2)	13.7 (56.7)	18.5 (65.4)
Mean daily minimum °C (°F)	10.2 (50.4)	10.1 (50.2)	10.9 (51.6)	12.9 (55.2)	16.0 (60.8)	19.7 (67.5)	22.9 (73.2)	23.6 (74.5)	21.5 (70.7)	17.8 (64.0)	14.3 (57.7)	11.5 (52.7)	16.0 (60.7)
Record low °C (°F)	1.4 (34.5)	2.4 (36.3)	2.4 (36.3)	5.8 (42.4)	9 (48)	13.3 (55.9)	16 (61)	17.9 (64.2)	13 (55)	8 (46)	5.1 (41.2)	1.6 (34.9)	1.4 (34.5)
Average precipitation mm (inches)	71.6 (2.82)	65.4 (2.57)	59.5 (2.34)	44.1 (1.74)	25.5 (1.00)	12.2 (0.48)	5.1 (0.20)	13.3 (0.52)	41.5 (1.63)	98.0 (3.86)	94.3 (3.71)	80.0 (3.15)	610.5 (24.02)
Average precipitation days	10	10	9	6	3	2	1	2	4	8	9	11	75
Average relative humidity (%)	73	72	72	72	72	71	69	71	72	71	70	73	72
Average dew point °C (°F)	5.6 (42.1)	7.7 (45.9)	8.5 (47.3)	10.7 (51.3)	13.7 (56.7)	16.9 (62.4)	19.5 (67.1)	20.5 (68.9)	18.7 (65.7)	14.9 (58.8)	11.3 (52.3)	8.9 (48.0)	13.1 (55.5)
Source 1: NOAA
Source 2: Altervista Extreme temperatures.

=== Topography ===
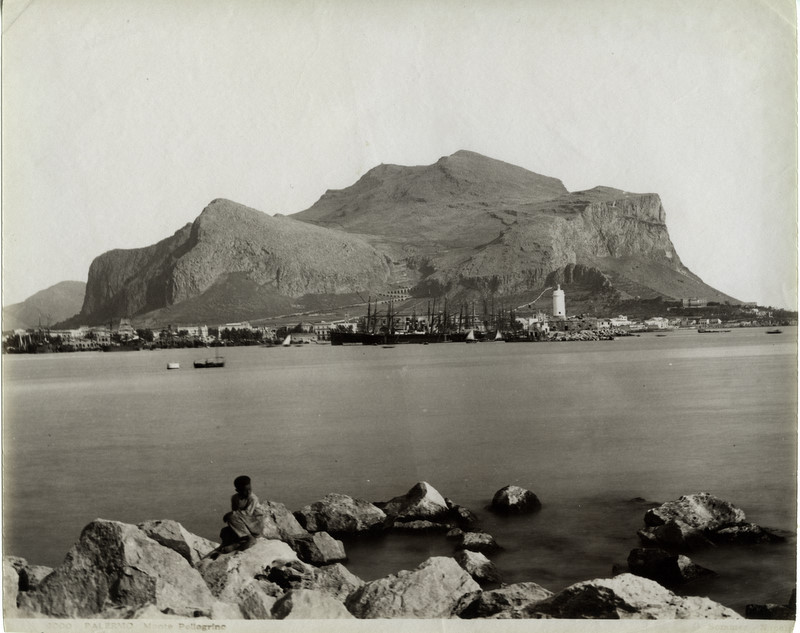
Mount Pellegrino, pictured at the end of the 19th century; the mountain is visible from everywhere in the city.

Palermo is surrounded by mountains, which form a cirque around the city. Some of the city's districts are divided by the mountains. Historically, it was relatively difficult to reach the inner part of Sicily from the city because of the mountains. The range's tallest peak is La Pizzuta, about 1,333 m (4,373 ft) high. Historically, the most important mountain is Monte Pellegrino, which is geographically separated from the rest of the range by a plain and lies right in front of the Tyrrhenian Sea. In his essay Italian Journey, Johann Wolfgang von Goethe called Monte Pellegrino's cliff "the most beautiful promontory in the world".

=== Rivers ===
Today both the Papireto river and the Kemonia are covered up by buildings, but their shape can still be recognised because the streets that were built on them follow their shapes. The only waterway not drained yet is the Oreto river, which divides the downtown of the city from the western uptown and the industrial districts. In the basins were many seasonal torrents that helped formed swampy plains, reclaimed during history; a good example can be found in the borough of Mondello.

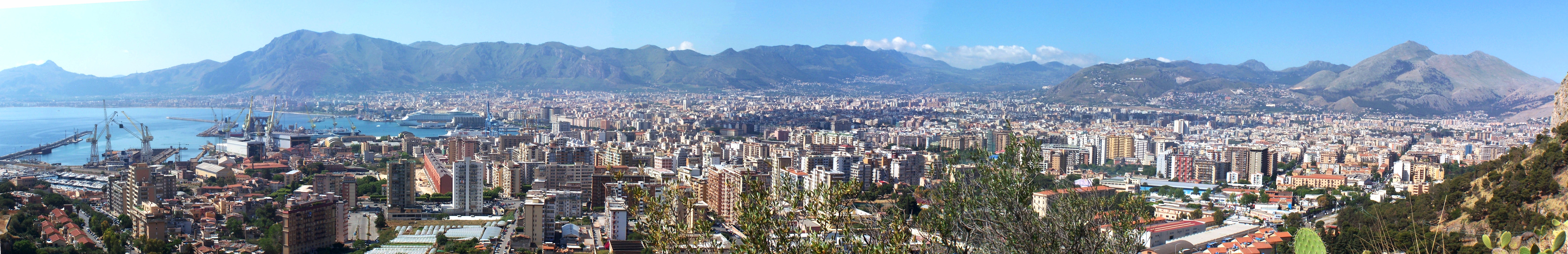
View of Palermo from Monte Pellegrino

=== Districts ===
Quarters of Palermo

Municipality	Quarters
I	Kalsa, Albergheria, Seralcadio & La Loggia
II	Settecannoli, Brancaccio & Ciaculli-Oreto
III	Villagrazia-Falsomiele & Stazione-Oreto
IV	Montegrappa, S. Rosalia, Cuba, Calatafimi, Mezzomonreale, Villa Tasca-Altarello & Boccadifalco
V	Zisa, Noce, Uditore-Passo di Rigano & Borgo Nuovo
VI	Cruillas, S. Giovanni Apostolo, Resuttana & San Lorenzo
VII	Pallavicino, Tommaso Natale, Sferracavallo, Partanna, Mondello, Arenella, Vergine Maria & San Filippo Neri
VIII	Politeama, Malaspina-Palagonia, Libertà & Monte Pellegrino

Shown above are the thirty five quarters of Palermo: these thirty five neighbourhoods or "quartiere" as they are known, are further divided into eight governmental community boards.

== Demographics ==
Historical population
Year	Pop.	±%
1861	199,911	—
1871	223,689	+11.9%
1881	244,898	+9.5%
1901	309,566	+26.4%
1911	339,465	+9.7%
1921	397,486	+17.1%
1931	379,905	−4.4%
1936	411,879	+8.4%
1951	490,692	+19.1%
1961	587,985	+19.8%
1971	642,814	+9.3%
1981	701,782	+9.2%
1991	698,556	−0.5%
2001	686,722	−1.7%
2011	657,561	−4.2%
2021	635,439	−3.4%
Source: ISTAT

As of 2026, the population is 626,273, of which 47.9% are male, and 52.1% are female. Minors make up 16.2% of the population, and seniors make up 24.0%.

=== Immigration ===
As of 2025, immigrants make up 5.0% of the population. The 5 largest foreign countries of birth are Bangladesh, Romania, Sri Lanka, Ghana, and Tunisia.

Foreign population by country of birth (2025)
Country of birth	Population
Bangladesh	5,965
Romania	2,600
Sri Lanka	2,441
Ghana	2,087
Tunisia	1,614
Philippines	1,477
Germany	1,160
Morocco	1,122
Mauritius	936
China	723
Nigeria	632
Ukraine	583
France	534
Ivory Coast	508
United States	502

== Culture ==
=== Religion ===
==== Patron saints ====
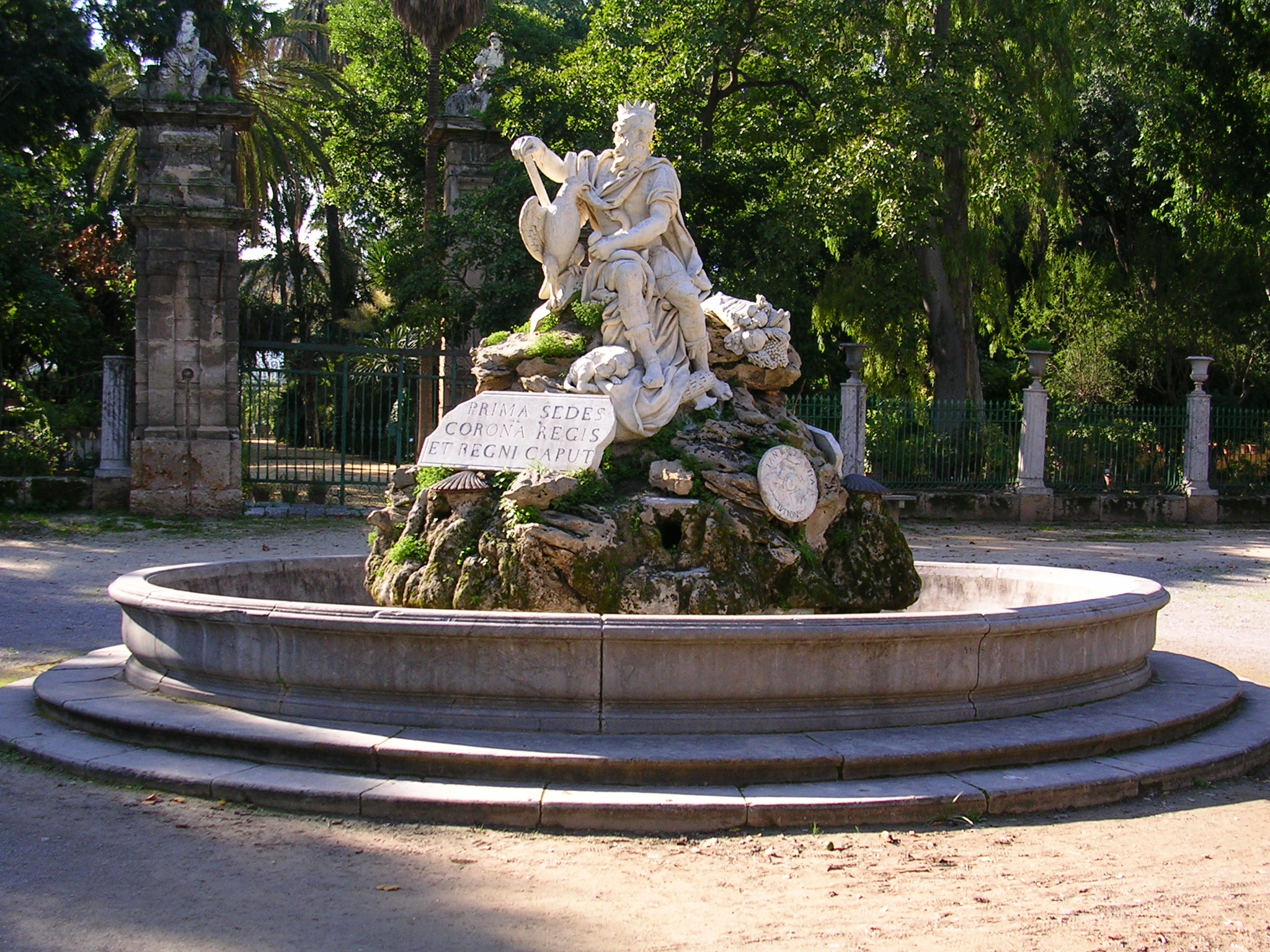
Genius of Palermo, the ancient patron of the city

The patron saint of Palermo is Saint Rosalia, who is widely revered.

On 14 July, people in Palermo celebrate the annual Festino, the most important religious event of the year. The Festino is a procession that goes through the main street of Palermo to commemorate the miracle attributed to Saint Rosalia who, it is believed, freed the city from the Black Death in 1624. Her remains were discovered in a cave on Monte Pellegrino, and her remains were carried around the city three times, banishing the plague. There is a sanctuary marking the spot where her remains were found which can be reached via a scenic bus ride from the.

Before 1624 Palermo had four patron saints, one for each of the four major parts of the city. They were Saint Agatha, Saint Christina, Saint Nympha and Saint Olivia.

Saint Lucy is also honoured with a celebration on 13 December, during which the inhabitants of Palermo do not eat anything made with flour, but boil wheat in its natural state and use it to prepare a special dish called cuccìa. This commemorates the saving of the city from famine due to a miracle attributed to Saint Lucy; A ship full of grain mysteriously arrived in the city's harbour and the hungry population wasted no time in making flour but ate the grain as it arrived.

Saint Benedict the Moor is the heavenly protector of the city of Palermo.

The ancient patron of the city was the Genius of Palermo, genius loci and numen protector of the place, that became the secular patron of the modern Palermo.

=== Sports ===
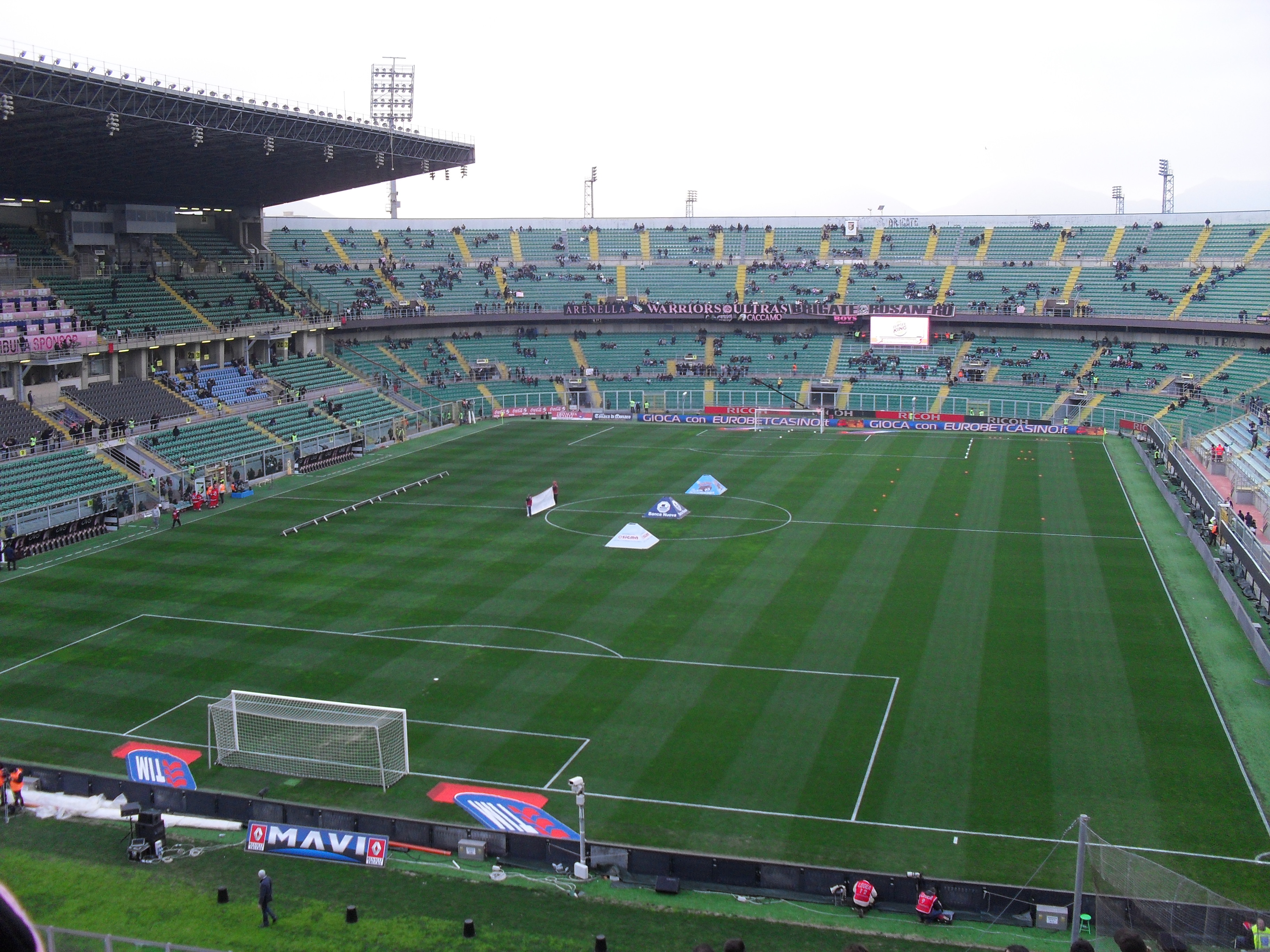
Stadio Renzo Barbera

Palermo hosts a professional football team, Palermo Football Club, commonly called simply Palermo, that competes in Serie B as of 2022, having been excluded from Serie B after the 2018–2019 season. After it went bankrupt in 2019, a new club was formed by the company Hera Hora Srl.

The Targa Florio was an open road endurance car race held near Palermo. Founded in 1906, it was one of the oldest sports car racing events until its discontinuation in 1977 due to safety concerns, but it has since run as a rallying event. Palermo was home to the grand depart of the 2008 Giro d'Italia. The initial stage was a 28.5 km-long (17.7 mi) TTT (Team Time Trial).

The Internazionali Femminili di Palermo is an annual ladies professional tennis event held in the city, which is part of the WTA Tour.

The American football team is Eagles United Palermo and it plays in stadium of Carini.

=== City emblems ===
==== Flag ====
The flag of Palermo is similar to that of the autonomous region of Sicily, but with a different arrangement of colours. The flag displayed on the Palazzo Pretorio, the town hall, has no coat of arms. However, versions with coats of arms of variable appearance in the center have been observed; for example, around the 1950s or 1960s the flag bore the civic coat of arms form Il Blasone in Sicilia.

Flag

Another flag in use

==== Coat of arms ====
The coat of arms consists of a shield with a red background, stamped by the crown of the city, in the center of which there is a gold-colored eagle with open wings holding in its claws the legend bearing the initials "S.P.Q.P.".

Coat of arms from Il Blasone in Sicilia (1871–1875)

Another coat of arms from Il Blasone in Sicilia (1871–1875)

Coat of arms used between 1891 and 1999

Coat of arms with the chief of the lictor, according to the official decree of recognition of 1942

Coat of arms in use since 1999

== Sights ==
=== UNESCO World Heritage Sites ===
Arab-Norman Palermo and the Cathedral Churches of Cefalù and Monreale
UNESCO World Heritage Site
- Interactive map of Arab-Norman Palermo and the Cathedral Churches of Cefalù and Monreale
- Criteria: Cultural: ii, iv
- Reference: 1487
- Inscription: 2015 (39th Session)
- Area: 6.235 ha (15.41 acres)
- Buffer zone: 483.03 ha (1,193.6 acres)

Palermo has a large architectural heritage and is notable for its many Arab-Norman buildings. UNESCO World Heritage Sites include the Palazzo Reale with the Cappella Palatina, the Chiesa di San Giovanni degli Eremiti, the Chiesa di Santa Maria dell'Ammiraglio, the Chiesa di San Cataldo, the Cattedrale di Palermo, the Palazzo della Zisa and the Ponte dell'Ammiraglio, adding to the list that makes Italy the country with most UNESCO world heritage sites.

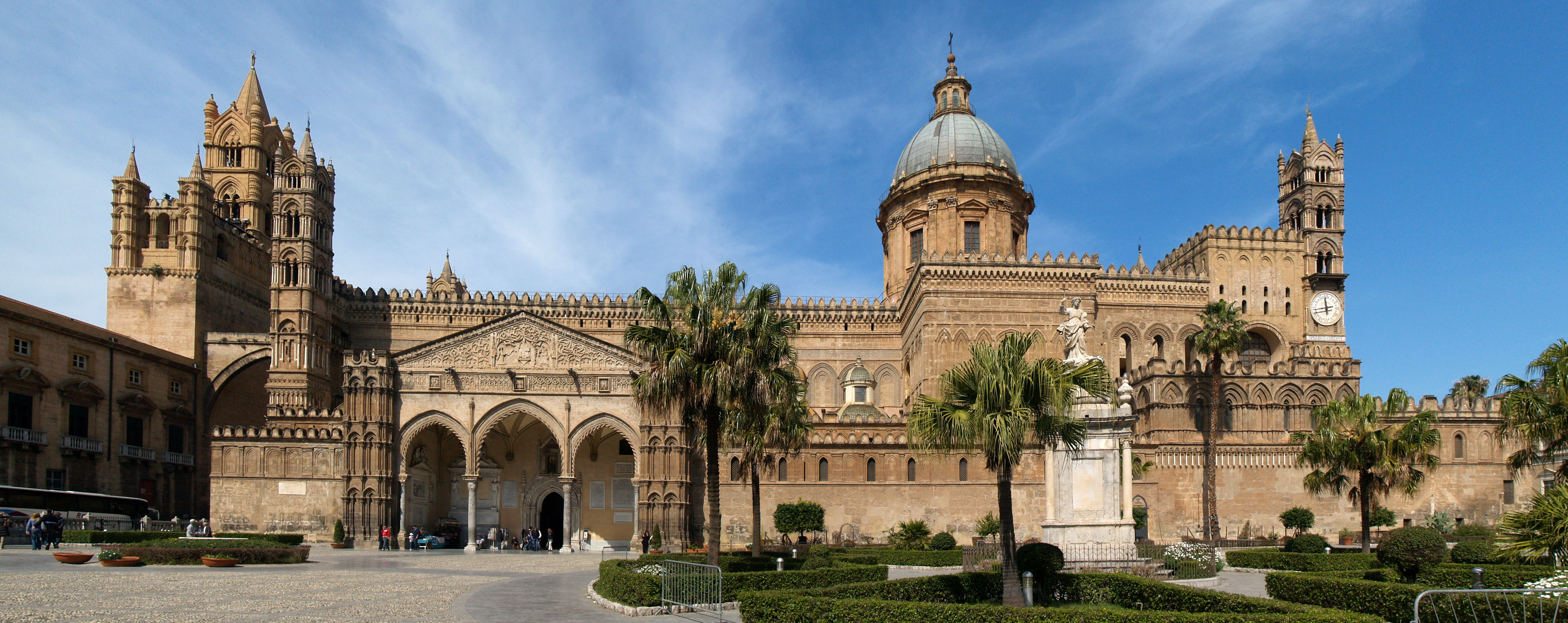
Palermo Cathedral

=== Palaces and museums ===
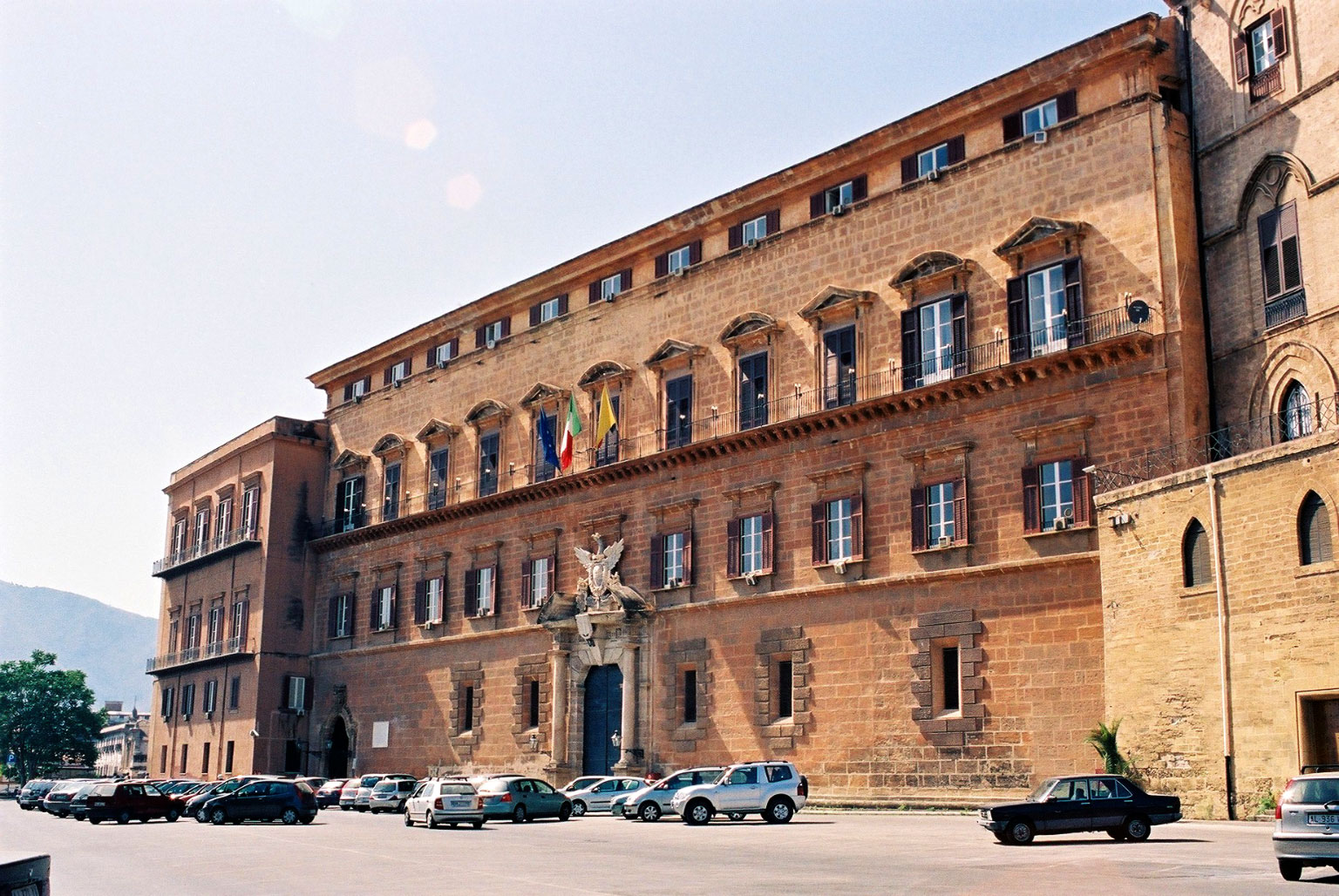
Palazzo dei Normanni, seat of the Sicilian Regional Assembly

- Palazzo dei Normanni (the Norman Palace), a notable example of Norman architecture, this palace houses the Cappella Palatina.
- Zisa (1160) and Cuba, magnificent castles/houses historically used by the kings of Palermo for hunting. The Zisa today houses the Islamic museum. The Cuba was once encircled by water.
- Palazzo Natoli
- Palazzo Chiaramonte
- Palazzo Abatellis: built at the end of the 15th century for the prefect of the city, Francesco Abatellis. It is a massive though elegant construction, in typical Catalan Gothic style, with Renaissance influences. The Gallery houses an Eleonora of Aragon bust by Francesco Laurana (1471) and the Malvagna Triptych (c. 1510), by Jan Gossaert and an Annunziata by Antonello da Messina.
- Antonino Salinas Regional Archaeological Museum: museum includes numerous remains from Etruscan, Carthaginian, Roman and Hellenistic civilisations. It houses all the decorative remains from the Sicilian temples of Segesta and Selinunte.
- Palazzina Cinese: royal residence of the House of Bourbon-Two Sicilies and location of the Ethnographic Museum of Sicily.

=== Churches ===
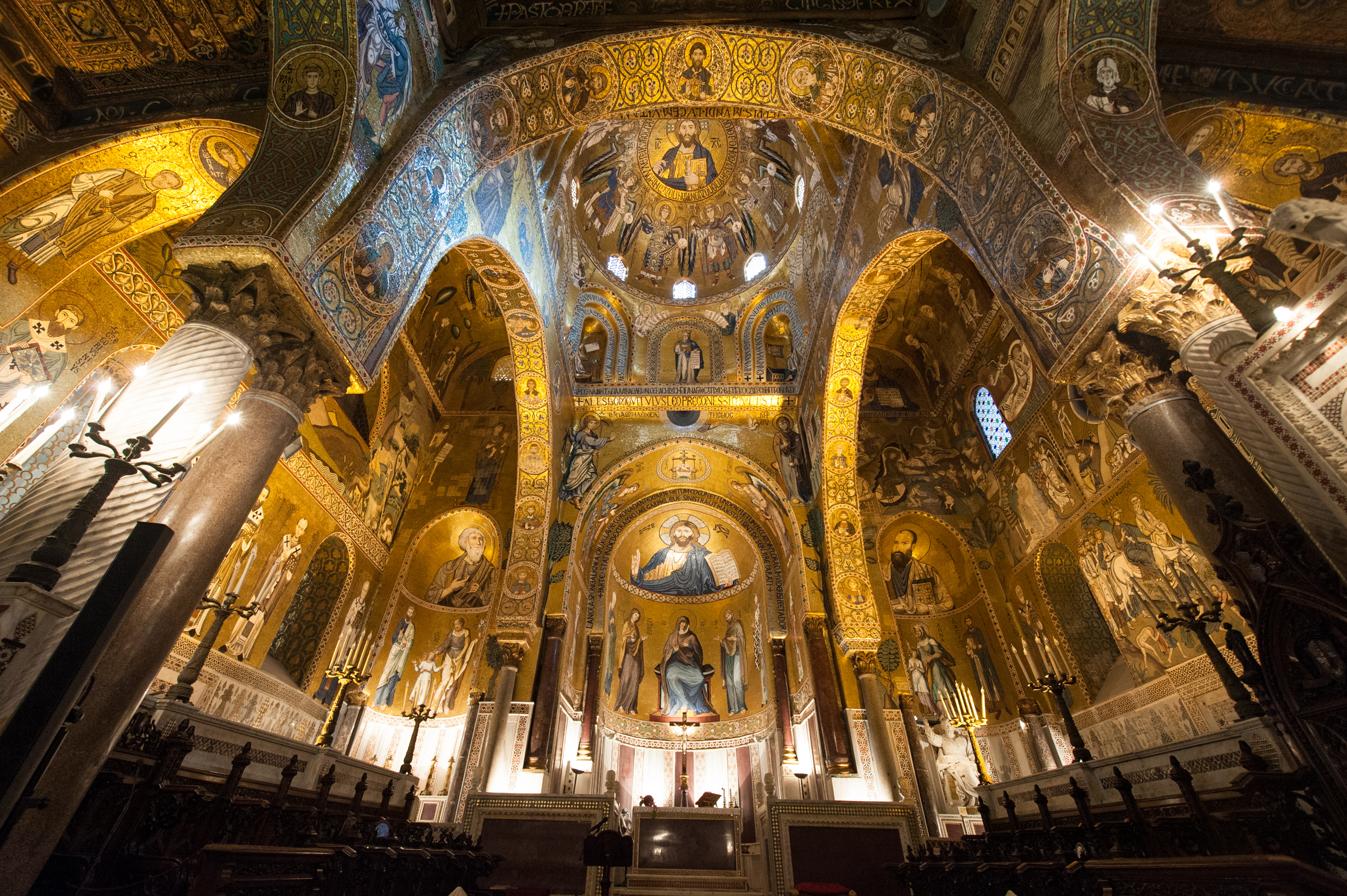
Cappella Palatina

- Palermo Cathedral: the long history of the cathedral led to an accumulation of different architectural styles, the latest being the 18th century.
- Cappella Palatina, 12th century chapel of the Palazzo dei Normanni, has outstanding mosaics in both Western and the Eastern traditions and a roof by Saracen craftsmen.
- San Giovanni dei Lebbrosi
- San Giovanni degli Eremiti: 12th-century church, near Palazzo dei Normanni, notable for bright red domes, a remnant of Arab influence in Sicily. In his Diary of an Idle Woman in Sicily, F. Elliot described it as "... totally oriental... it would fit well in Baghdad or Damascus". The bell tower is an example of Norman architecture.
- Chiesa della Martorana: also known as Santa Maria dell'Ammiraglio (St Mary of the Admiral), church annexed to the next-door church of San Cataldo and overlooks Piazza Bellini in central Palermo. Original layout was a compact cross-in-square ("Greek cross plan"), a common south Italian and Sicilian variant of the middle Byzantine period church style. Three eastern apses adjoin directly to the naos, instead of being separated by an additional bay, as was usual in eastern Byzantine architecture. The bell tower, lavishly decorated, still serves as the main entrance to the church. The interior decoration is elaborate, and includes Byzantine mosaics.
- San Cataldo: church on central Piazza Bellini, another example of Norman architecture.
- Santa Maria della Gancia
- Santa Caterina: church located on Piazza Bellini, behind Piazza Pretoria, built between 1566 and 1596.
- Santa Maria della Catena: built between 1490 and 1520. Designed by Matteo Carnilivari: The name derives from chains that were once attached to one of the walls.
- San Domenico: located near Via Roma, now "Pantheon of illustrious Sicilians".
- San Giuseppe dei Teatini: located near the Quattro Canti, it is an example of Sicilian Baroque.
- Oratorio di San Lorenzo: working in stucco, Rococo sculptor Giacomo Serpotta and his family decorated the church (1690/98–1706) with such a profusion of statuary, and an abundance of putti, the walls appear alive. In October 1969, two thieves removed Caravaggio's Nativity with St. Francis and St. Lawrence from its frame. It has never been recovered.
- Oratorio del Rosario di Santa Cita and Oratorio del Rosario di San Domenico, stuccoes by Giacomo Serpotta
- Santa Teresa alla Kalsa, derives its name from Al-Khalisa, an Arabic term meaning elected, was constructed between 1686 and 1706 over the former Emir's residence, is one of the best examples of Sicilian Baroque. It has a single, airy nave, with stucco decorations from the early 18th century.
- Santa Maria dello Spasimo was built in 1506 and later turned into a hospital. This church inspired Raphael to paint his famous Sicilia's Spasimo, now in the Museo del Prado. The church today is a fascinating open-air auditorium, which occasionally houses exhibitions and musical shows.
- Church of the Gesù ("Church of Jesus"): located in the city centre, the church was built in 1564 in the late-Renaissance style by the Jesuits. It was built over a pre-existing convent of Basilian monks. Alterations in 1591 were completed in a Sicilian Baroque. The church was heavily damaged after the 1943 bombings, which destroyed most of the frescos. The interior has a Latin cross plan with a nave and two aisles, and has a particularly rich decoration of marbles, intarsia and stuccoes, especially in St Anne's Chapel. At the right is the Casa Professa, with a 1685 portal and a precious 18th century cloister. The building has been home to the Municipal Library since 1775.
- San Francesco di Assisi: church built between 1255 and 1277 in what was once the market district of the city, at the site of two pre-existing churches and was largely renovated in the 15th, 16th, 18th and 19th centuries, the last after an earthquake. After the 1943 bombings, the church was restored to its Medieval appearance, which now includes part of the original building such as part of the right side, the apses and the Gothic portal in the façade. The interior has a typical Gothic flavour, with a nave and two aisles separated by two rows of cylindrical pilasters. Some of the chapels are in Renaissance style, as well as the late 16th century side portals. The church includes precious sculptures by Antonio, Giacomo Gagini and Francesco Laurana. Of note are also statues built by Giacomo Serpotta in 1723.
- Church of the Magione: officially known as the church of the Holy Trinity. This church was built in the Norman style in 1191 by Matteo d'Ajello, who donated it to the Cistercian monks.
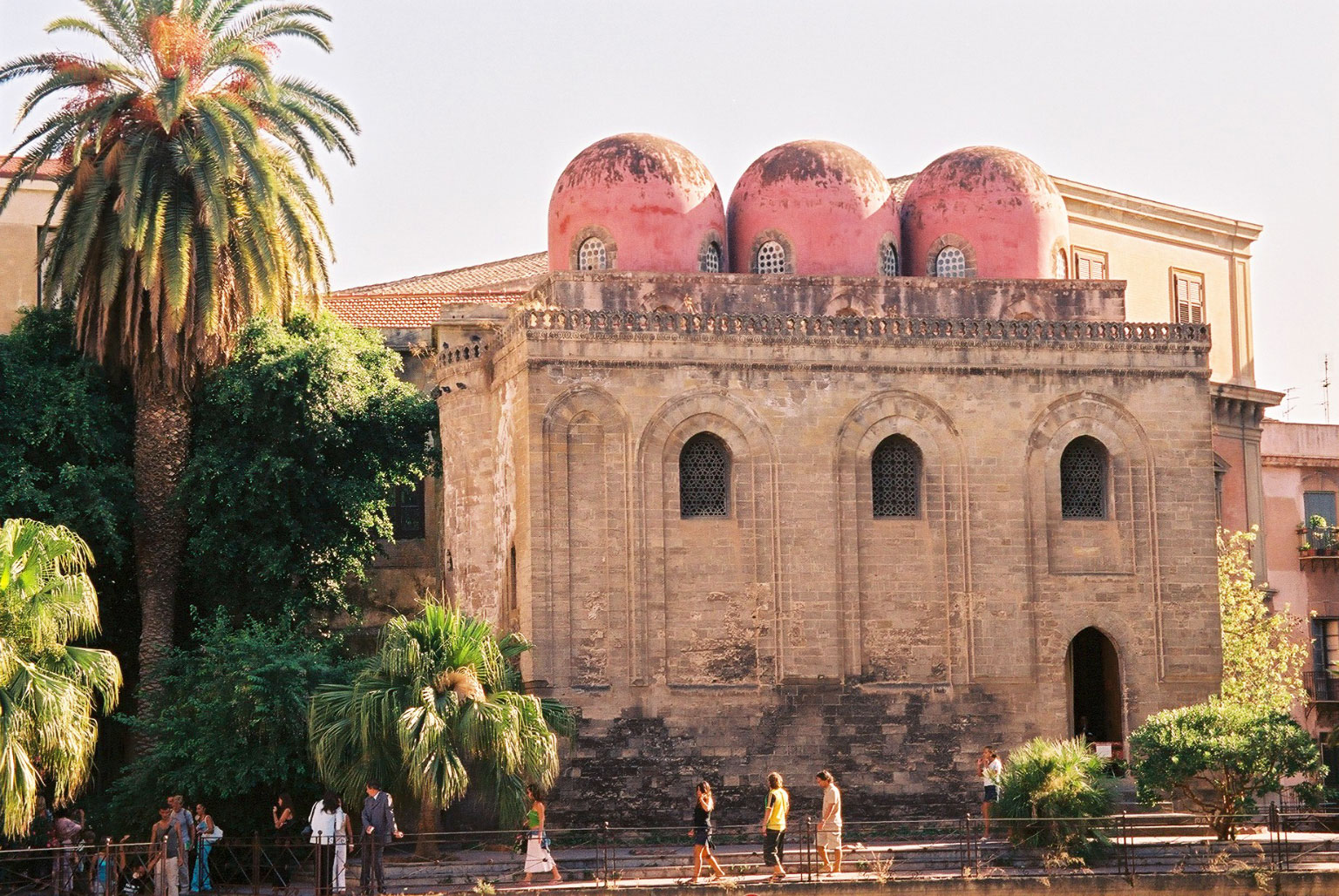
San Cataldo

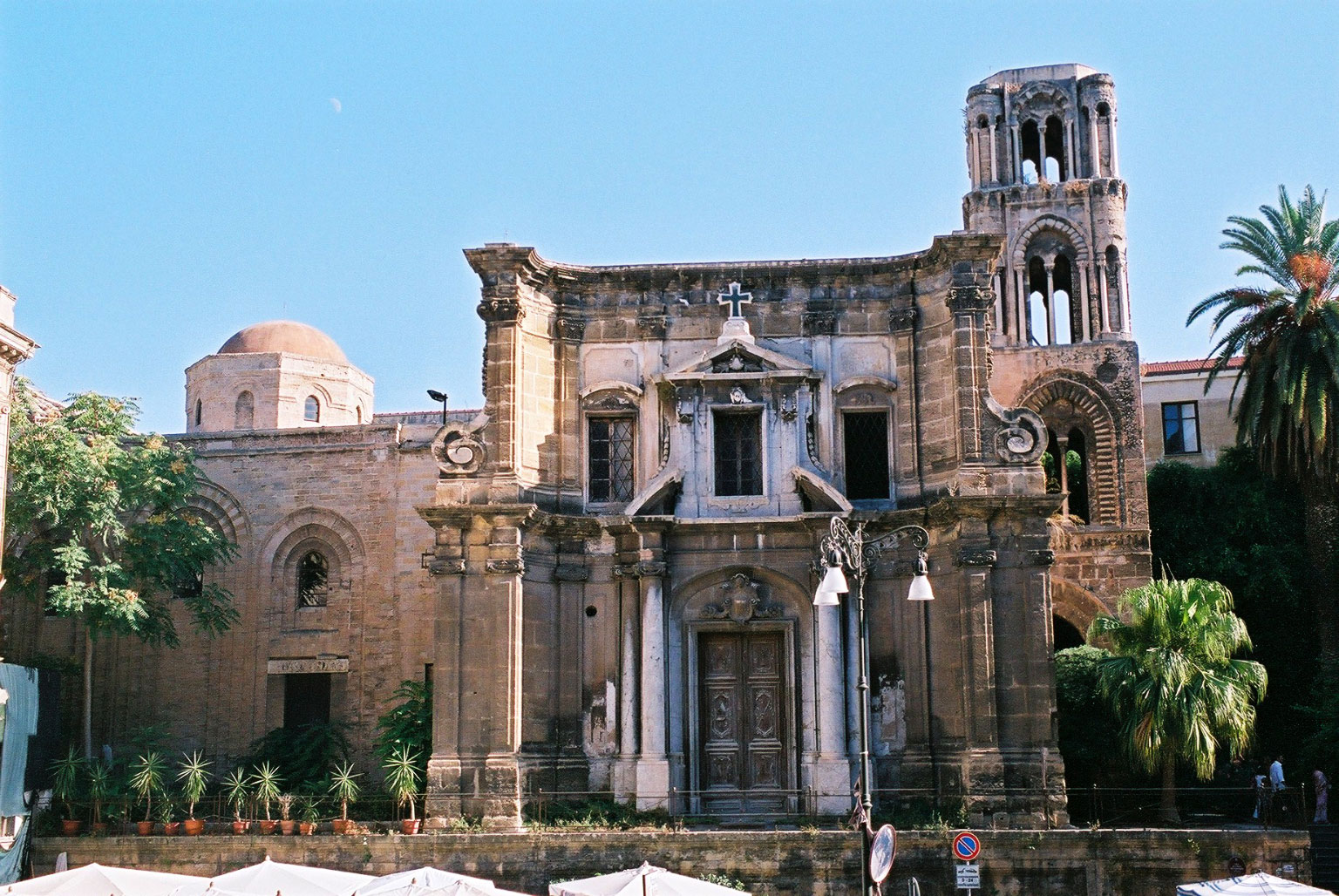
Chiesa della Martorana

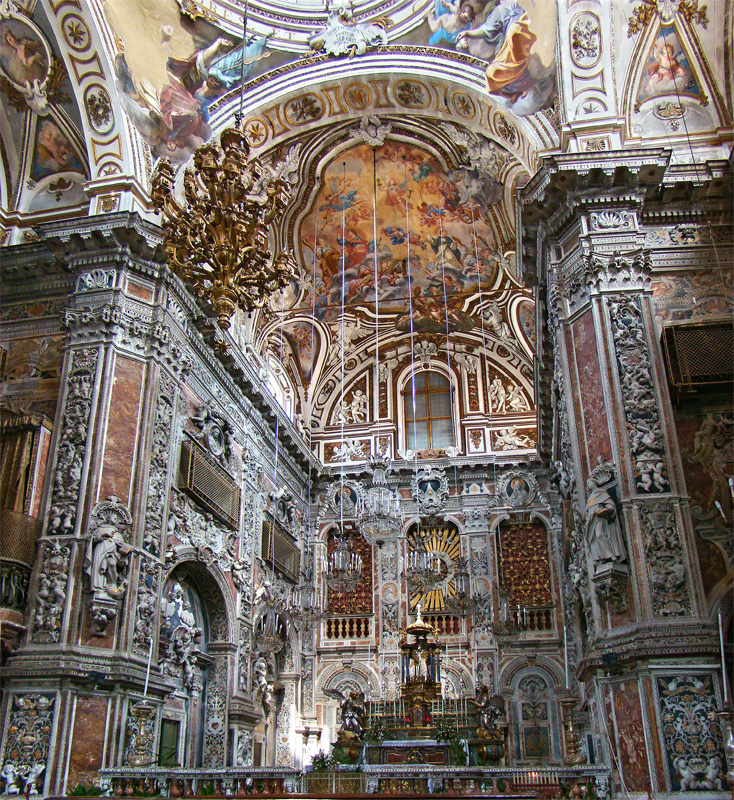
Santa Caterina

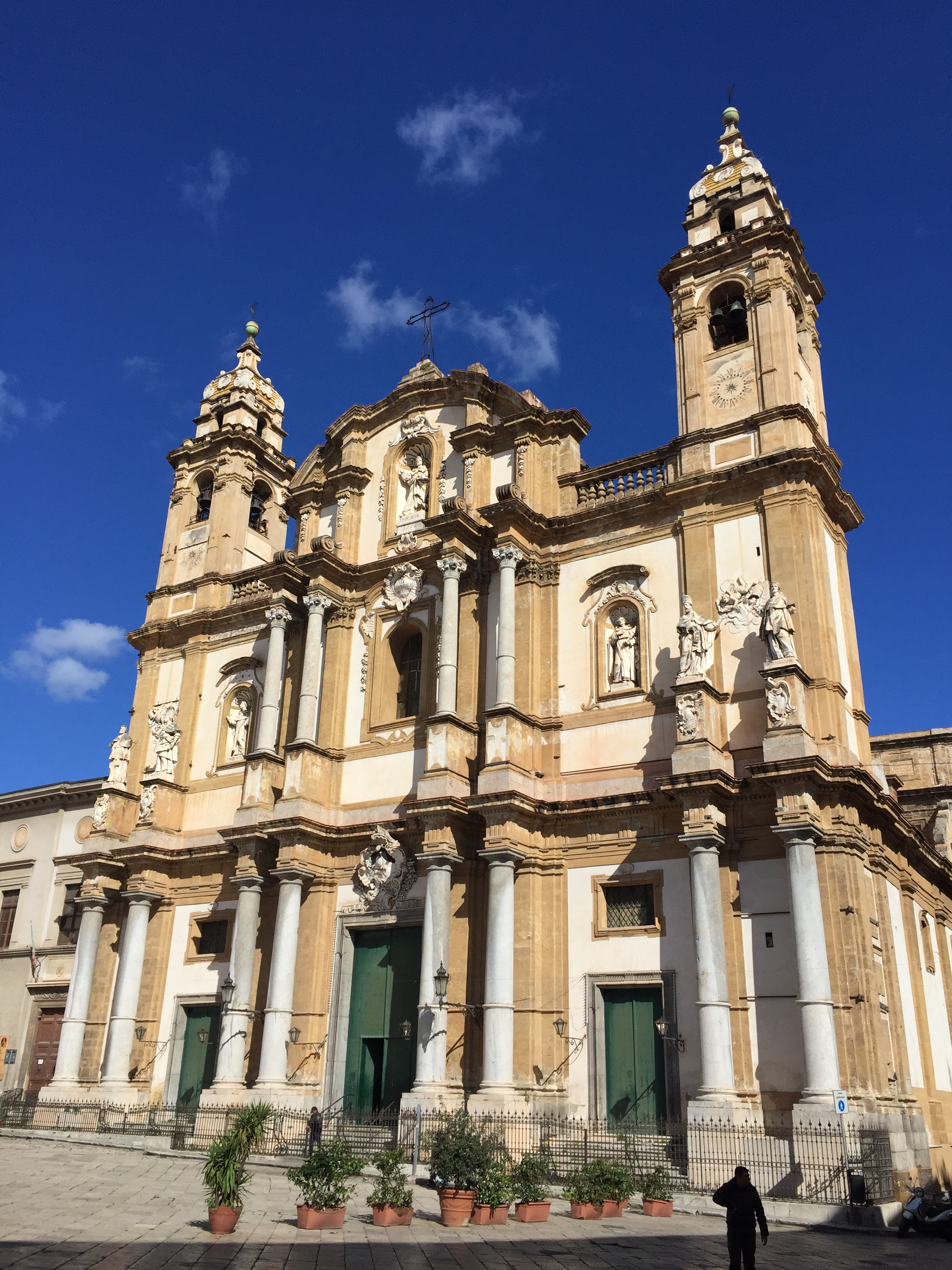
San Domenico

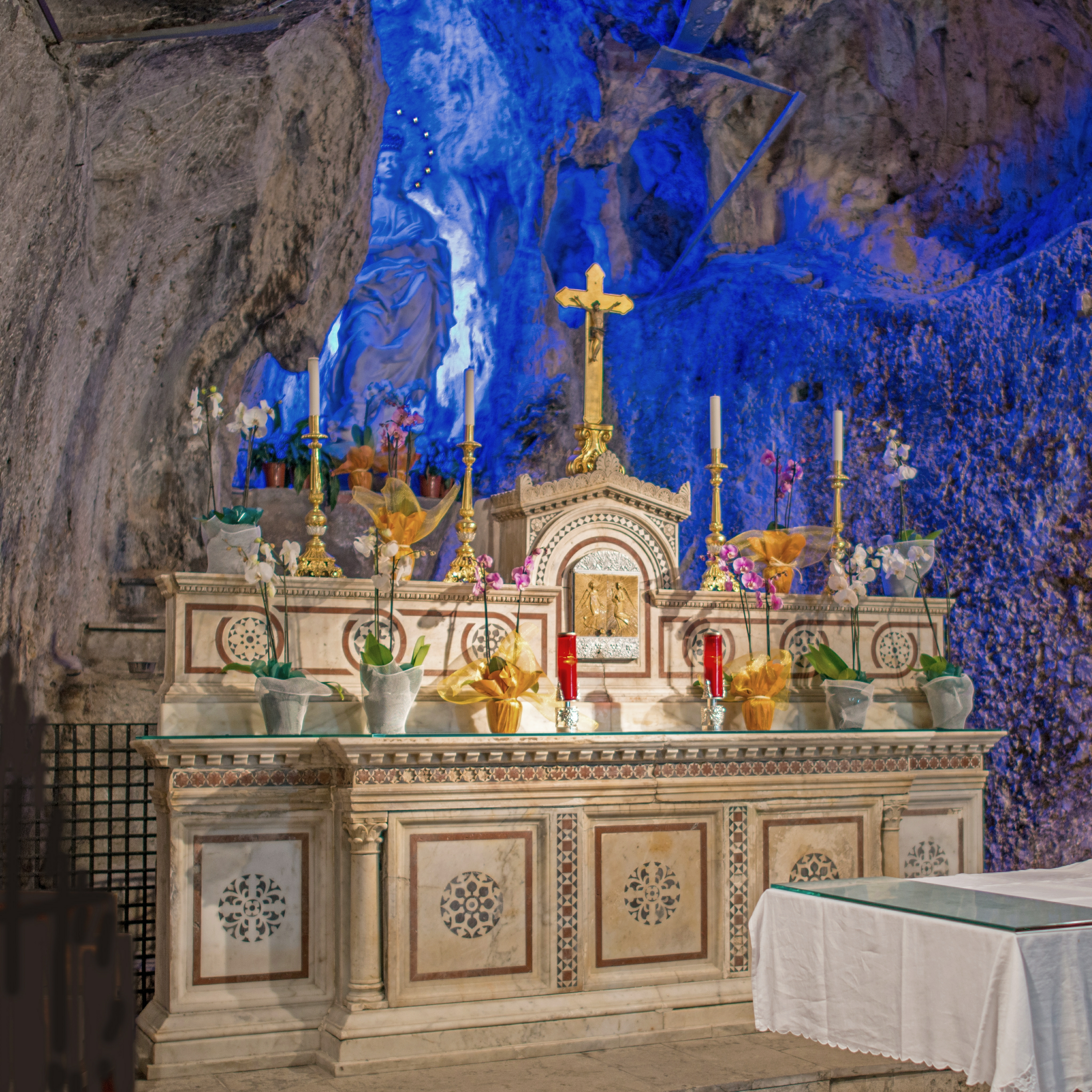
Santuario di Santa Rosalia

=== Squares and public monuments ===
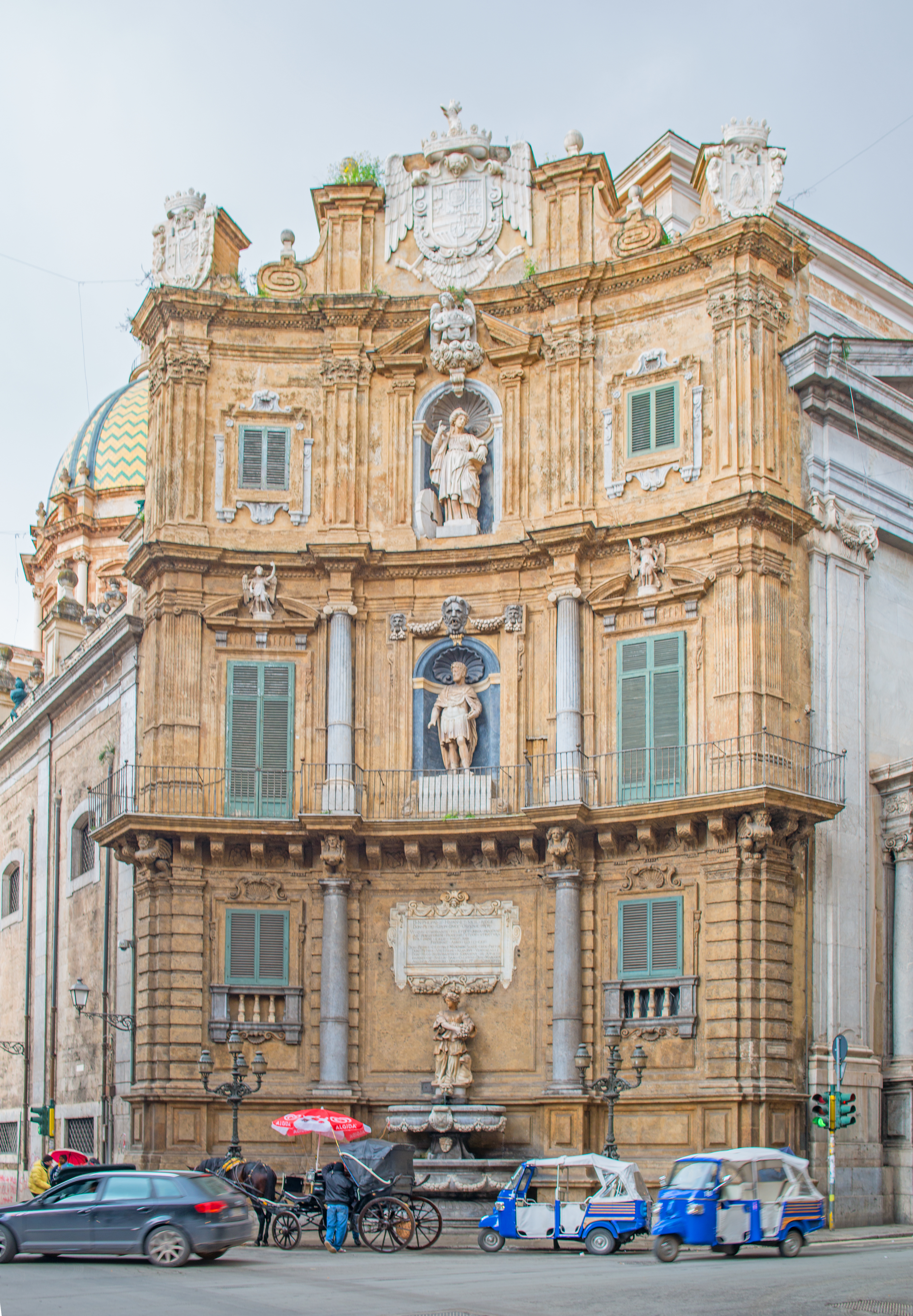
Quattro Canti

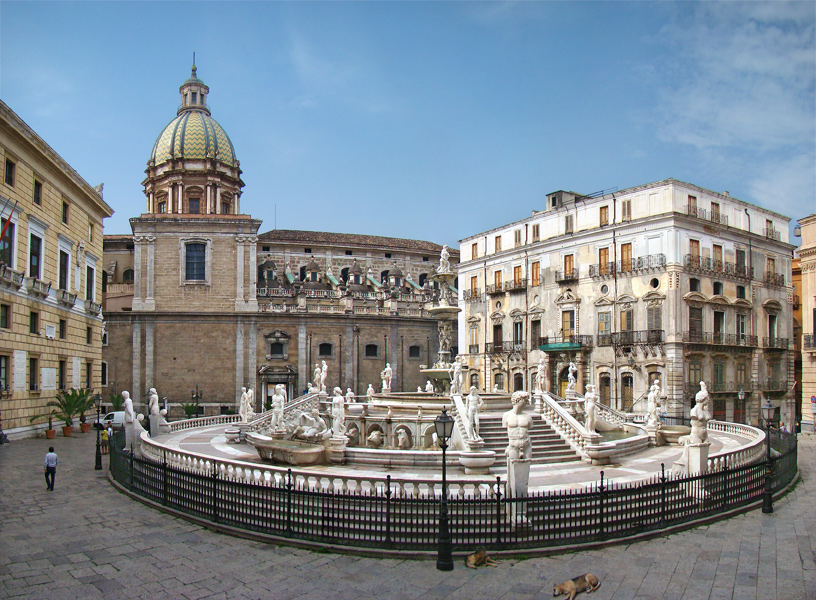
Piazza Pretoria

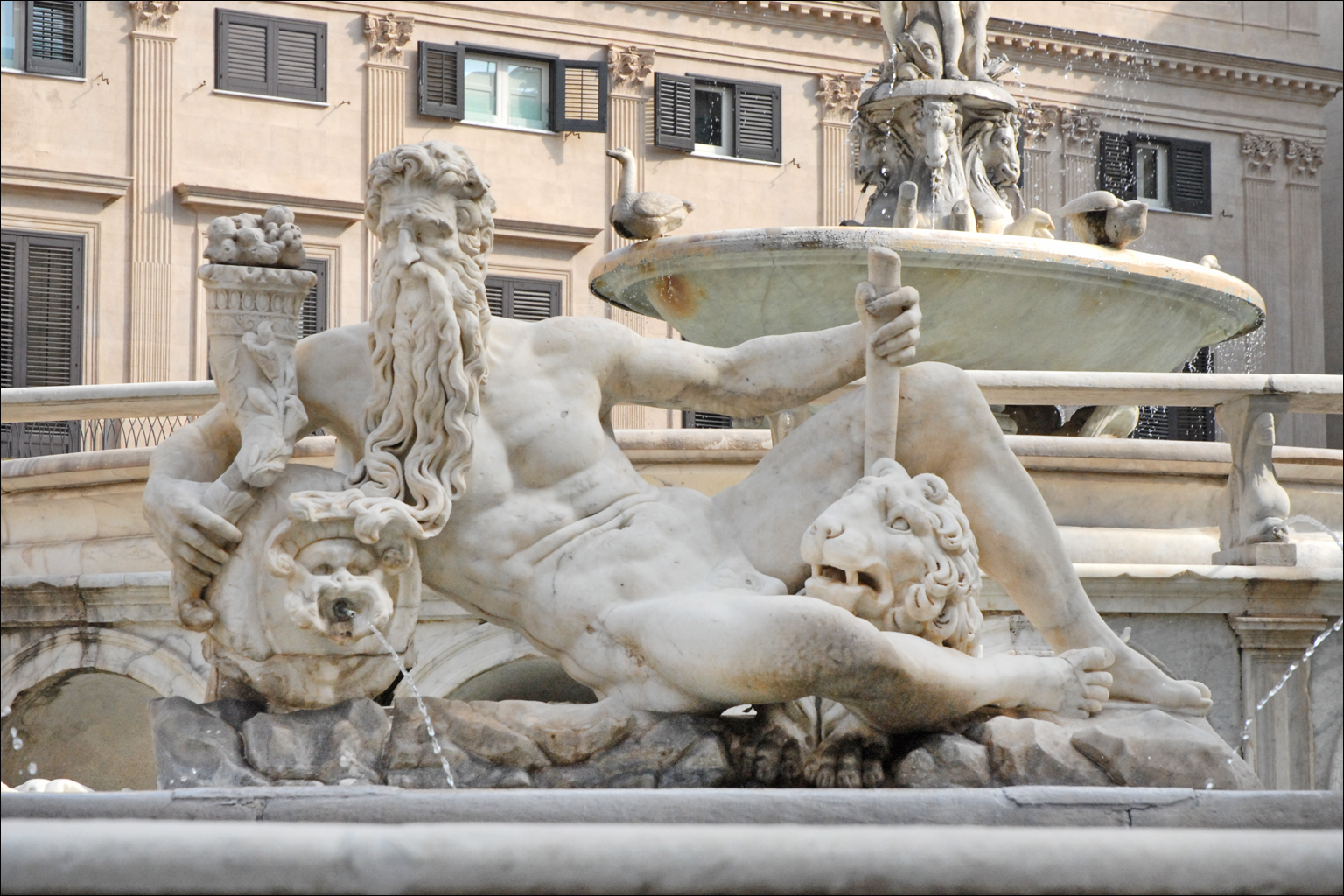
Fontana Pretoria

- Quattro Canti is a small square at the crossing of the ancient main roads (now: Corso Vittorio Emanuele and Via Maqueda) dividing the town into its quarters (mandamenti). The buildings at the corner have diagonal baroque façades so the square has an almost octagonal form.
- Piazza Pretoria was planned in the 16th century near the Quattro Canti as the site of a fountain by Francesco Camilliani, the Fontana Pretoria.
- The monument to Charles V on Piazza Bologni, erected in 1631.

=== City walls ===
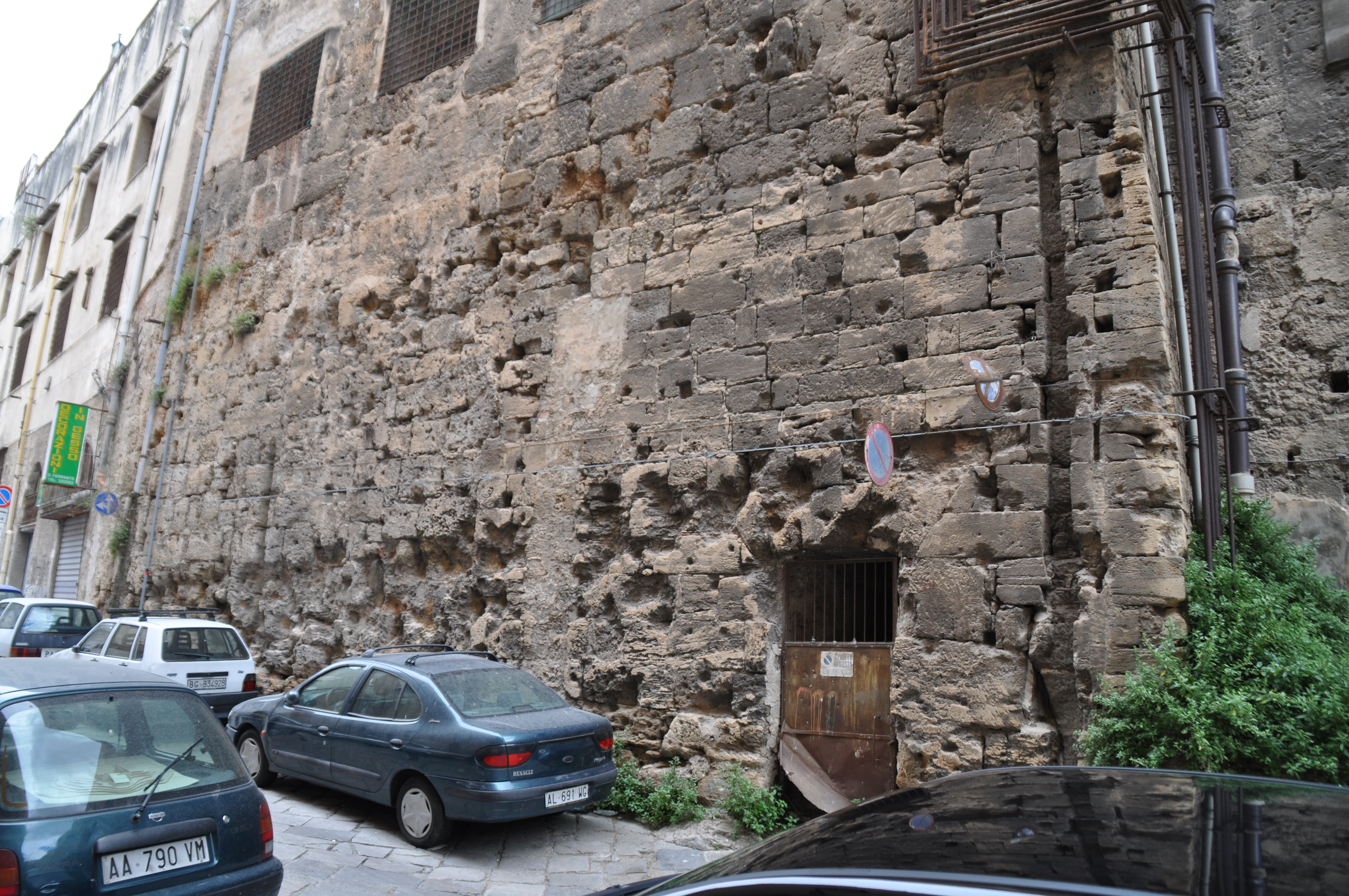
Phoenician wall in via degli Schioppettieri

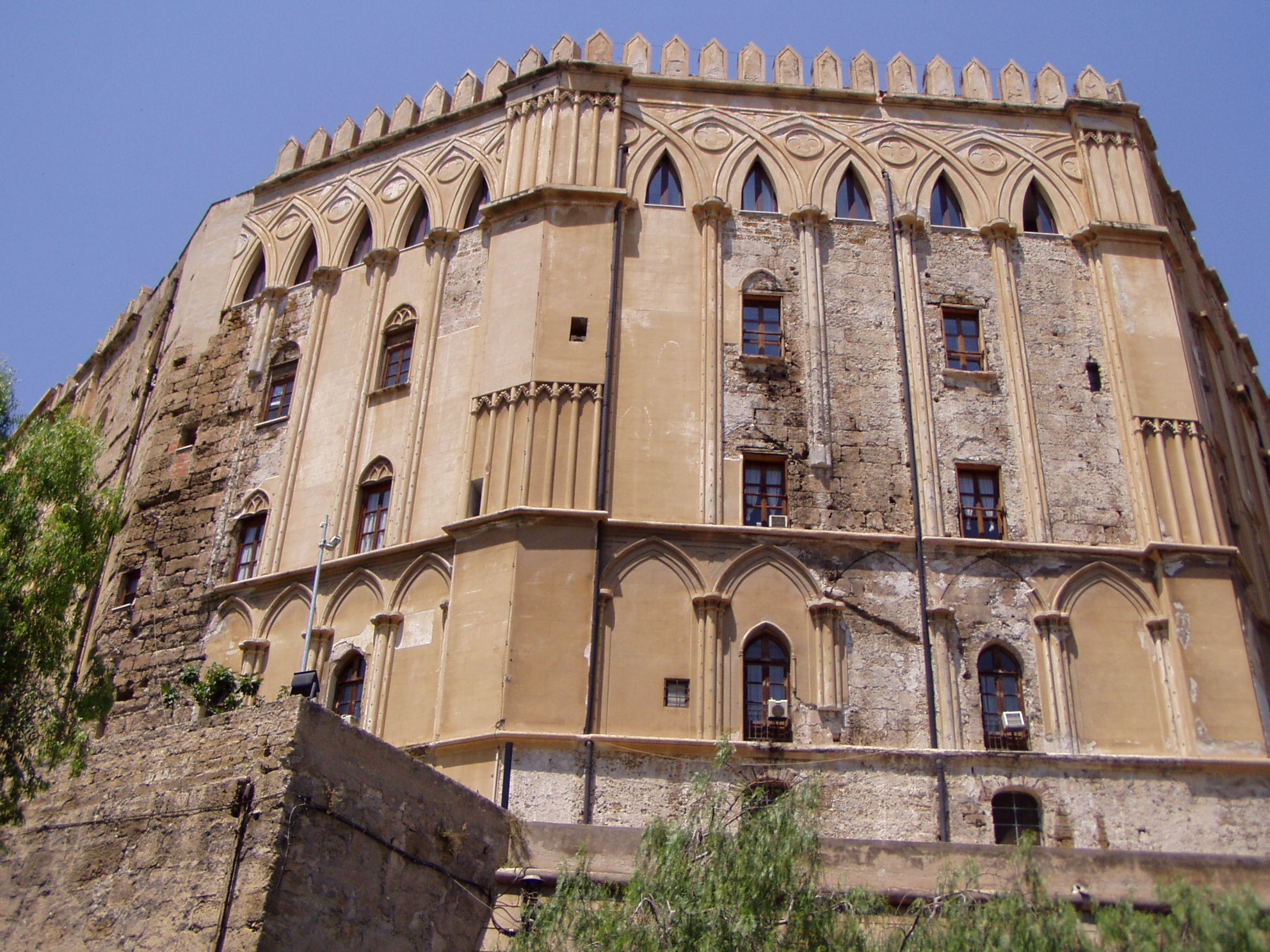
The Palazzo dei Normanni

Palermo had two rings of city walls, many parts of which still survive. The first ring surrounded the ancient core of the Phoenician city, the Palaeopolis or Paleapolis (in the area east of Porta Nuova) and the Neapolis. Via Vittorio Emanuele was the main road east–west through this early walled city. The eastern edge of the walled city was on Via Roma and the ancient port in the vicinity of Piazza Marina. The wall circuit was approximately Porto Nuovo, Corso Alberti, Piazza Peranni, Via Isodoro, Via Candela, Via Venezia, Via Roma, Piazza Paninni, Via Biscottari, Via Del Bastione, Palazzo dei Normanni and back to Porto Nuovo.

The walls followed the course of the two rivers that surround the city, the Kemonia and the Papireto, creating a natural moat and improving the military security of the city. During the Roman era, they were certainly implemented, as deducible from the subsequent account of Procopius of Caesarea about the capture of Palermo.

In the medieval period the city was expanded with a second wall. Via Vittorio Emanuele continued to be the main road east–west through the walled city. The west gate was still Porta Nuova, the walls continued to Corso Alberti, to Piazza Vittorio Emanuele Orlando where it turned east along Via Volturno to Piazza Verdi and along the line of Via Cavour. At this northeast corner the Castello a Mare protected the port at La Cala. A huge chain was used to block La Cala with the other end at Santa Maria della Catena (St Mary of the Chain). The sea-side wall was along the western side of Foro Italico Umberto. The wall turns west along the northern side of Via Abramo Lincoln, continues along Corso Tukory. The wall turns north approximately on Via Benedetto, to Palazzo dei Normanni and back to Porta Nuova.

Several gates in the city wall survive.

=== Opera houses ===
Until the beginning of the 20th century there were hundreds of small opera theatres known as magazzeni in Palermo.

- The Teatro Massimo ("Greatest Theatre") was opened in 1897. It is the biggest in Italy (8,000 m^{2}; 86,000 sq ft), and one of Europe's largest (third after the Paris Opera and the Vienna State Opera), renowned for its acoustics. Enrico Caruso sang in a performance of La Gioconda during the opening season, returning for Rigoletto at the end of his career. Closed for renovation from 1974 until 1997, it is now restored and has an active schedule.
- The Teatro Politeama was built between 1867 and 1874.
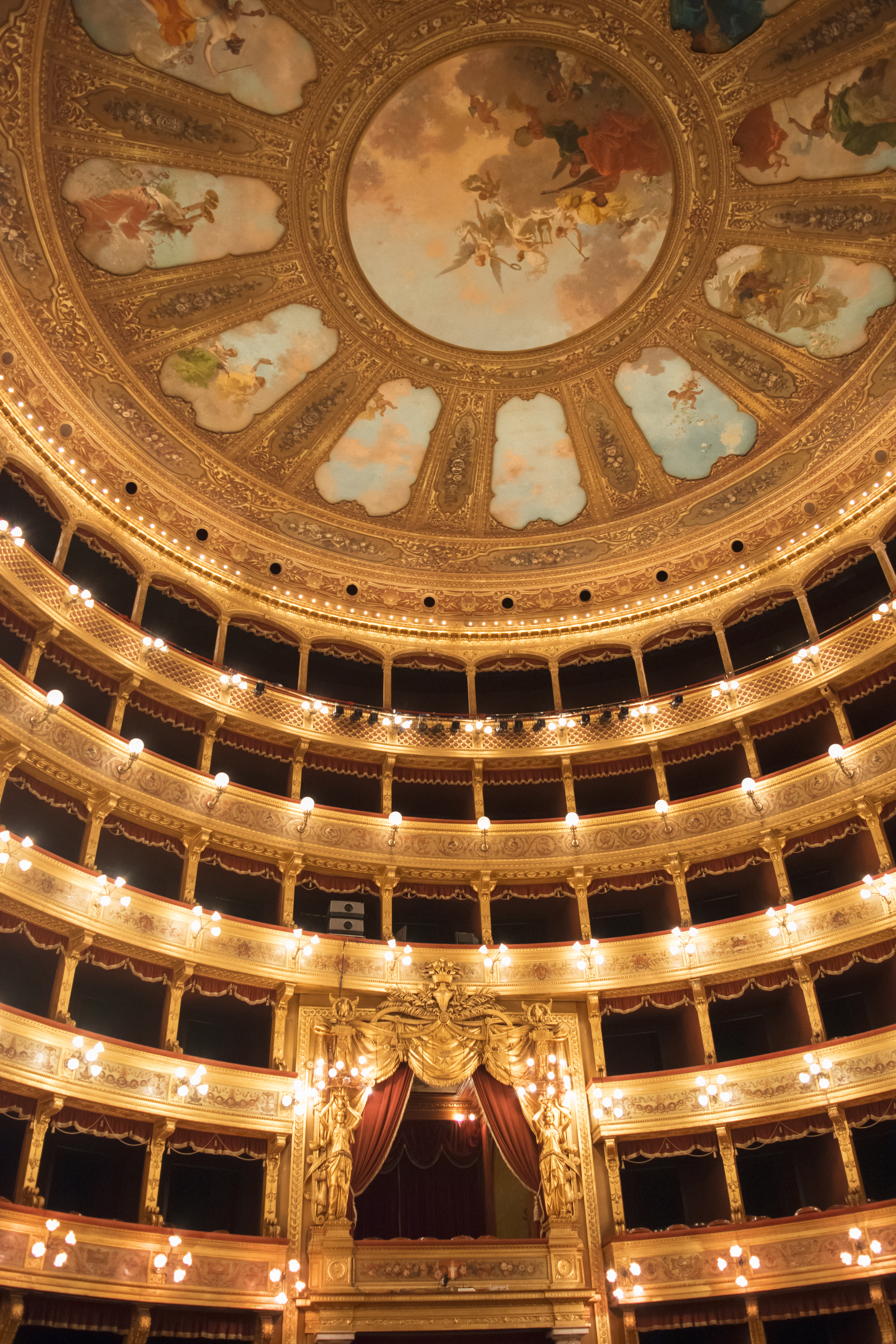
Teatro Massimo

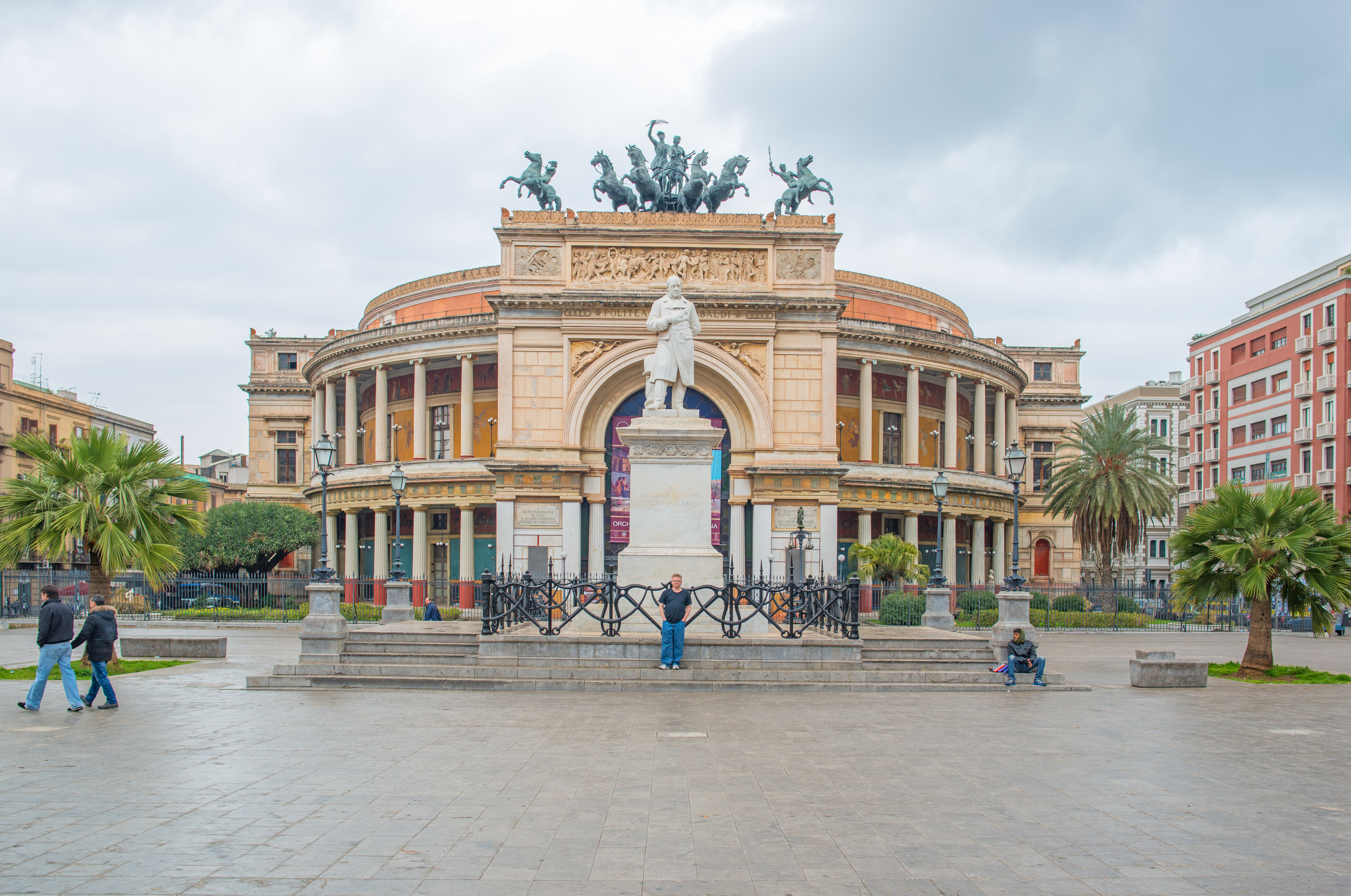
Teatro Politeama

=== Other sights ===
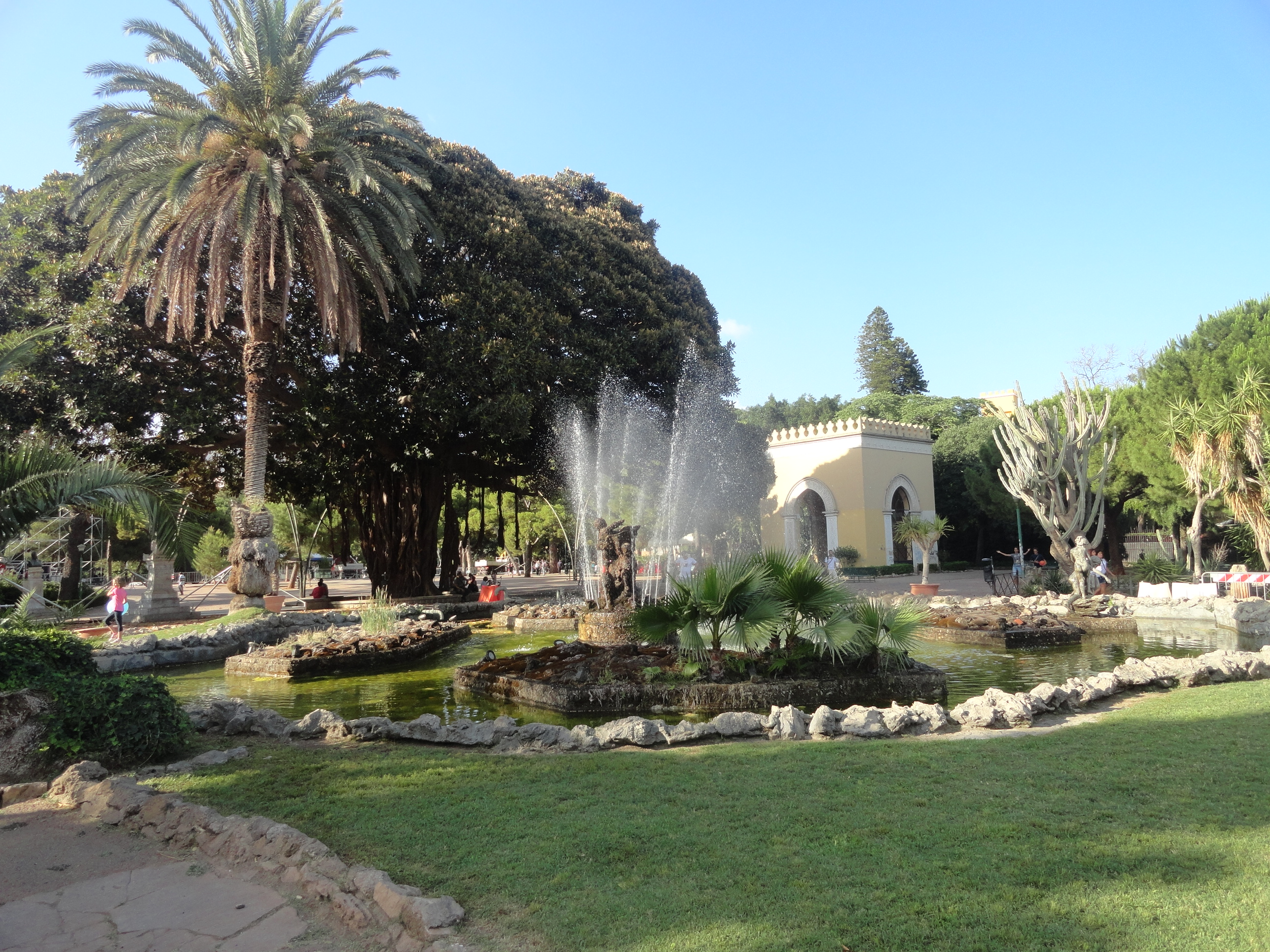
Giardino Inglese

The Wall of Legality (Il Muro Della Legalità) depicts 38 important persons who helped in fighting the mafia. The street art project was inaugurated in July 2022 and is a joint effort by 19 artists. It can be found at Piazza degli Aragonesi.

The cathedral has a heliometer (solar observatory) dating to 1690, one of a number built in Italy in the 17th and 18th centuries. The device itself is quite simple: a tiny hole in one of the minor domes acts as pinhole camera, projecting an image of the sun onto the floor at solar noon (12:00 in winter, 13:00 in summer). There is a bronze line, la Meridiana, on the floor, running precisely north–south. The ends of the line mark the positions as at the summer and winter solstices; signs of the zodiac show the various other dates throughout the year.

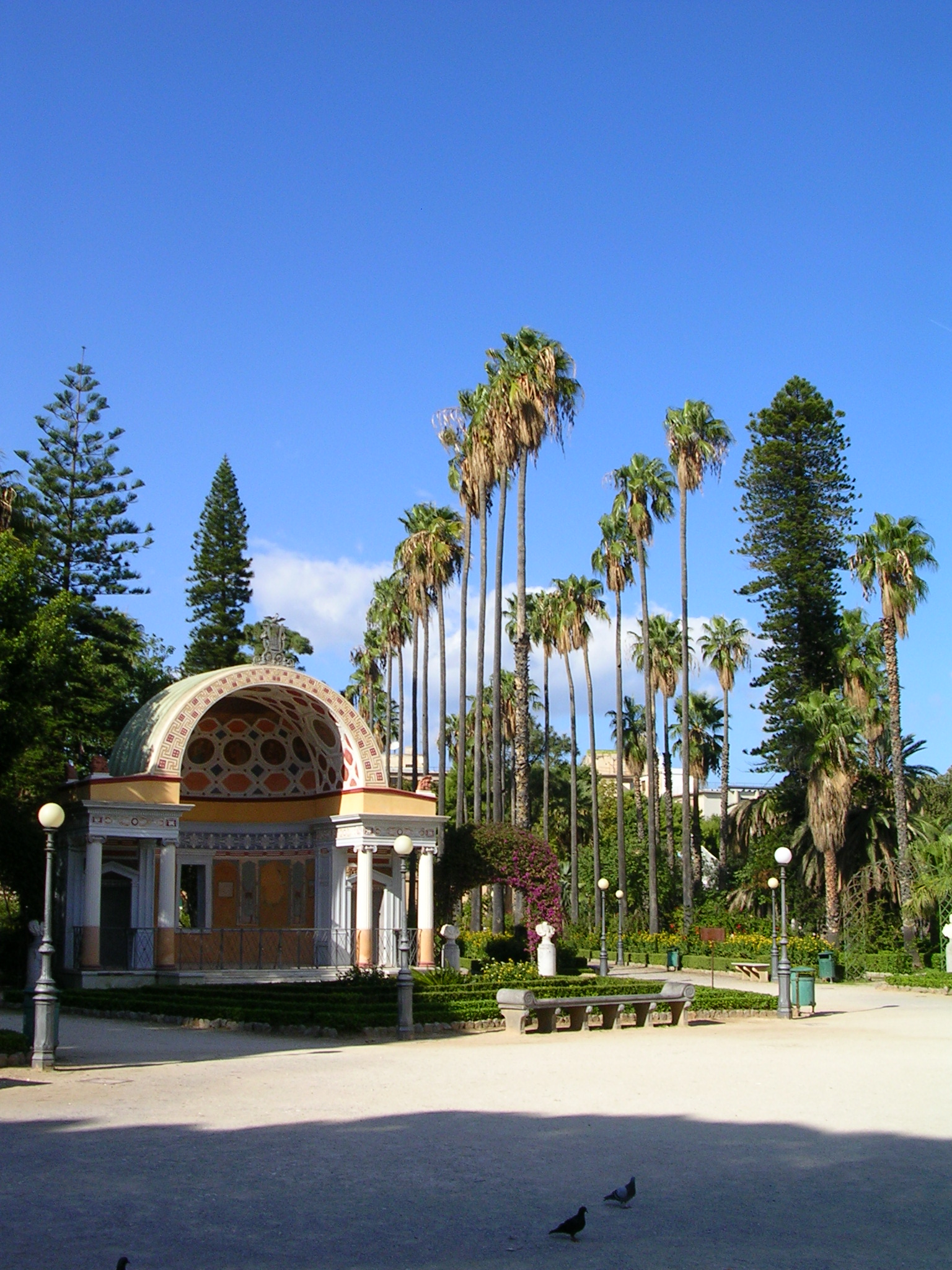
Villa Giulia (Palermo)

The purpose of the instrument was to standardise the measurement of time and the calendar. The convention in Sicily had been that the (24‑hour) day was measured from the moment of dawn, which meant that no two locations had the same time and, more importantly, did not have the same time as in St. Peter's Basilica in Rome. It was also important to know when the vernal equinox occurred, to provide the correct date for Easter.

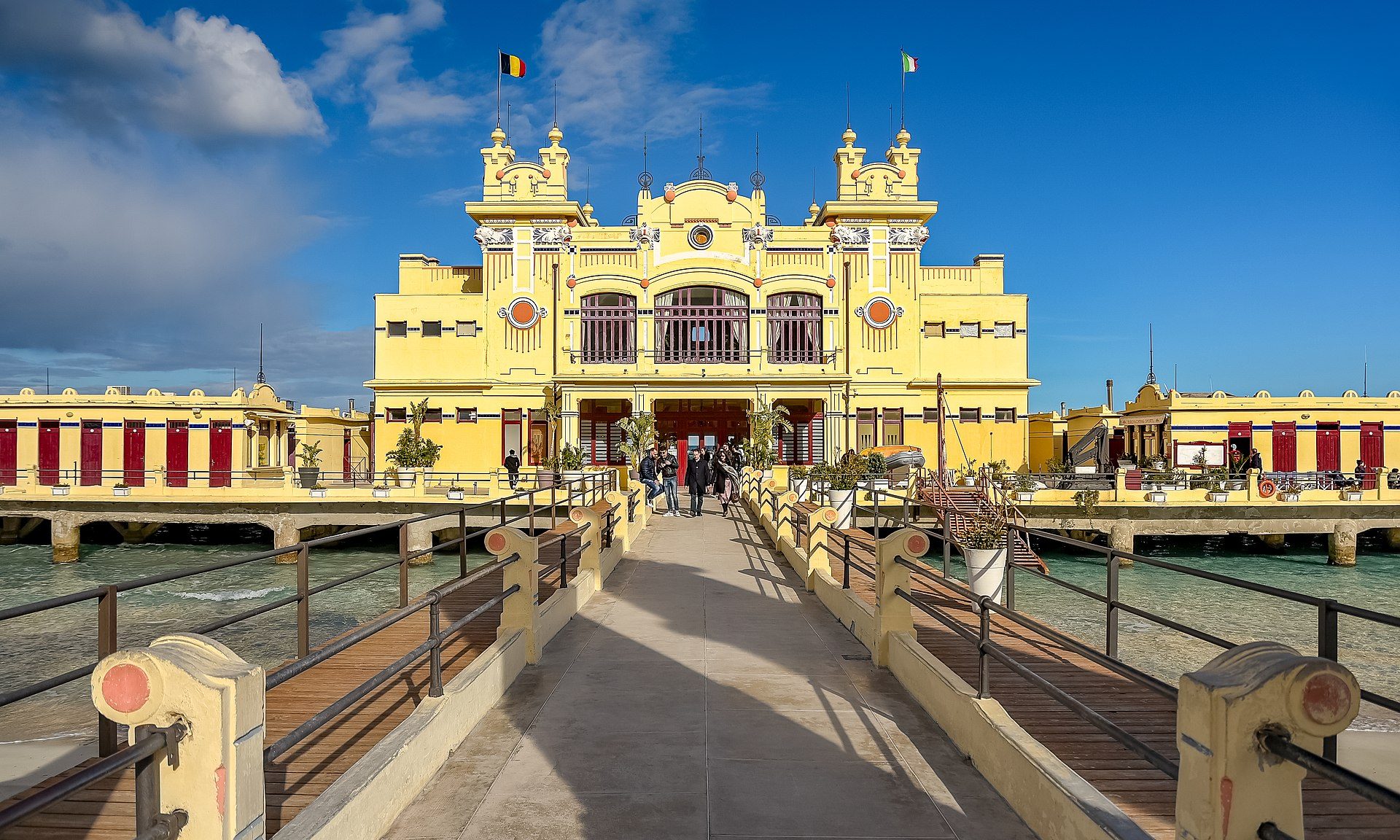
The Antico Stabilimento Balneare (Ancient Bathing Establishment) located in Mondello, a seaside borough north of Palermo, is an Art Nouveau or Liberty-style building atop piers of the beach in the town.

The Orto botanico di Palermo (Palermo Botanical Garden), founded in 1785, is Italy's largest, with a surface of 10 ha (25 acres).

One site of interest is the Capuchin Catacombs, with many mummified corpses in varying degrees of preservation.

Close to the city is the 600-metre-high (2,000 ft) Monte Pellegrino, offering a panorama of the city, its surrounding mountains and the sea.

Another good panoramic viewpoint is the promontory of Monte Gallo (586 m; 1,923 ft), near Mondello Beach.

A Moreton Bay fig of >30 m girth and of 32 m height can be found on the Piazza Marina. This Ficus macrophylla is most probably the thickest tree in Europe.

On the boulevard Via Roma is the Palazzo delle Poste, a government building created during the Mussolini era in the stripped classicism style. It was designed by the rationalist and later fascist government architect Angiolo Mazzoni. Perhaps its most famous feature is the five-mural cycle in the Futurist style by the artist Benedetta Cappa, Sintesi delle Comunicazioni (Synthesis of Communication).

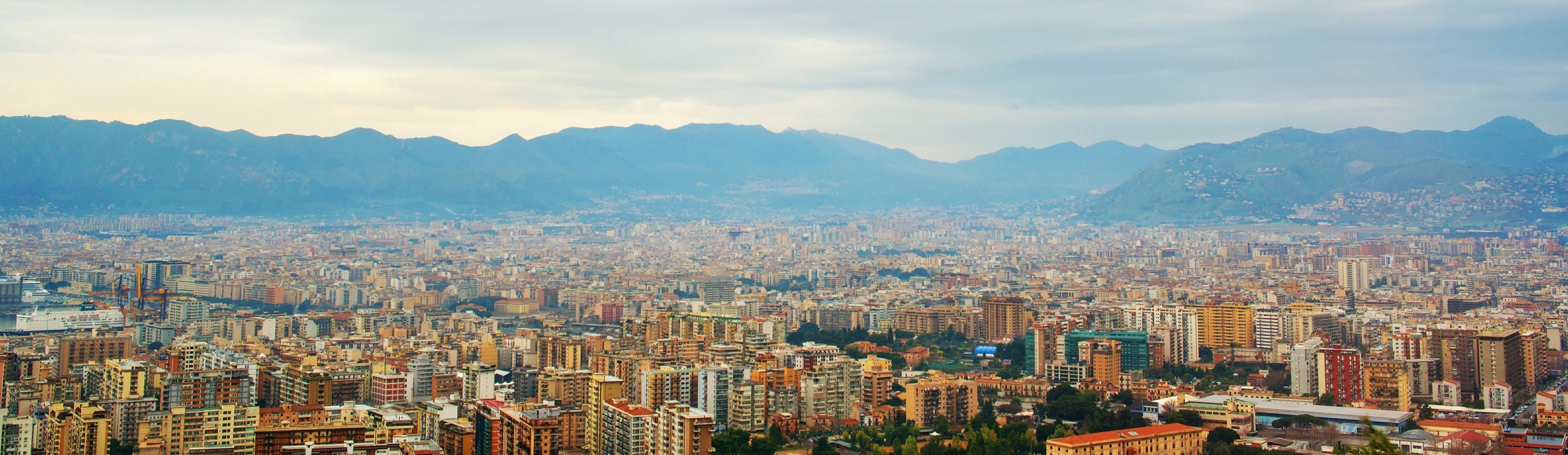
Panorama

== Economy ==
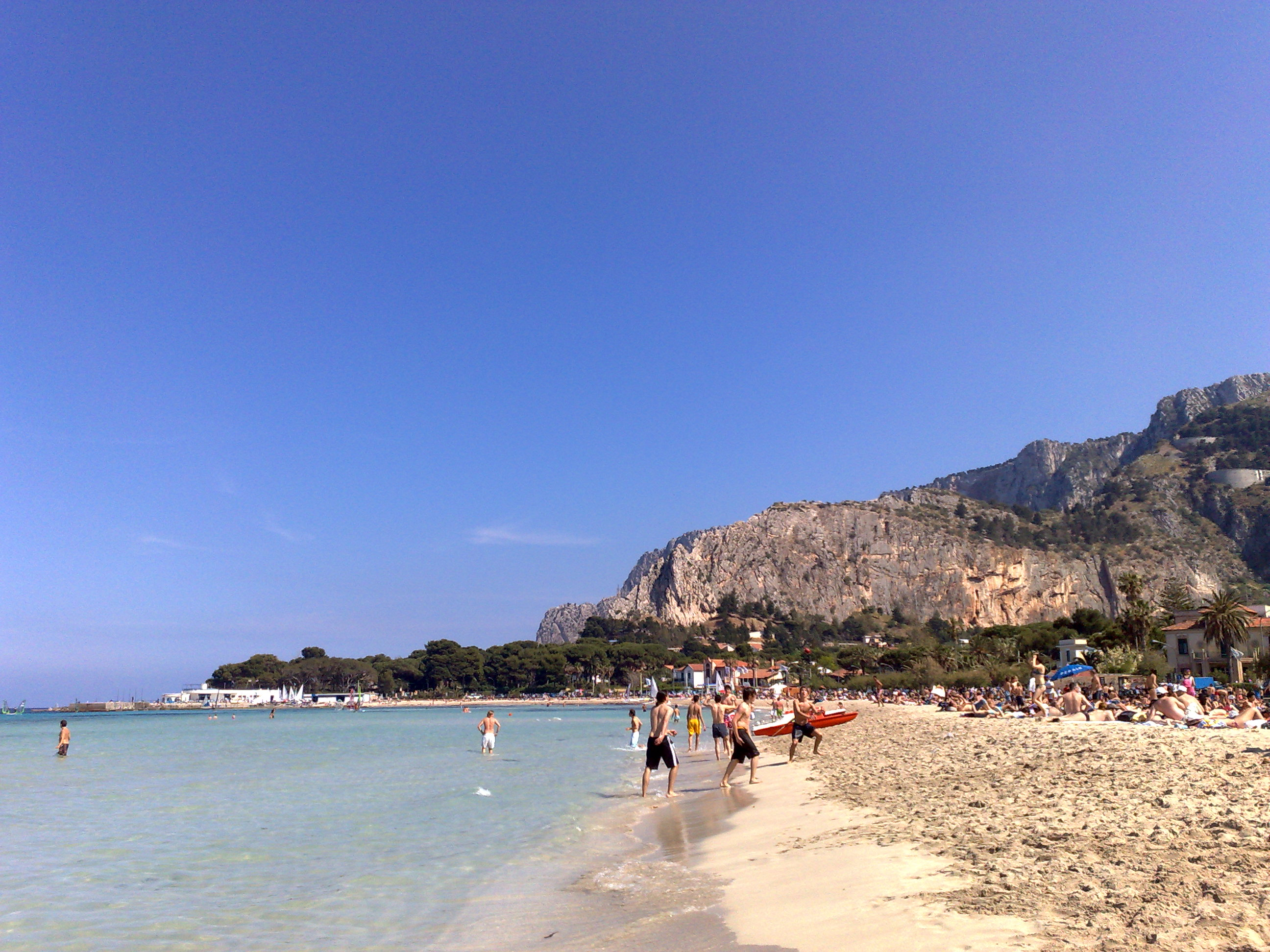
The Mondello Beach, one of the main tourist destinations

As Sicily's administrative capital, Palermo is a centre for much of the region's finance, tourism and commerce. It has an international airport, and Palermo's economic growth over the years has brought the opening of many new businesses. The economy mainly relies on tourism and services, but also has commerce, shipbuilding and agriculture. But Palermo still has high unemployment, high corruption, and a significant black market (Palermo being the home of the Sicilian Mafia).

== Transport ==
=== Public transport ===
Palermo has a local railway, the Palermo metropolitan railway service.

The average amount of time people spend commuting with public transit in Palermo, for example to and from work, on a weekday is 63 min. 14.% of public transit riders, ride for more than 2 hours every day. The average amount of time people wait at a stop or station for public transit is 23 min, while 48% of riders wait for over 20 minutes on average every day. The average distance people usually ride in a single trip with public transit is 4.4 km, while 3% travel for over 12 km in a single direction.

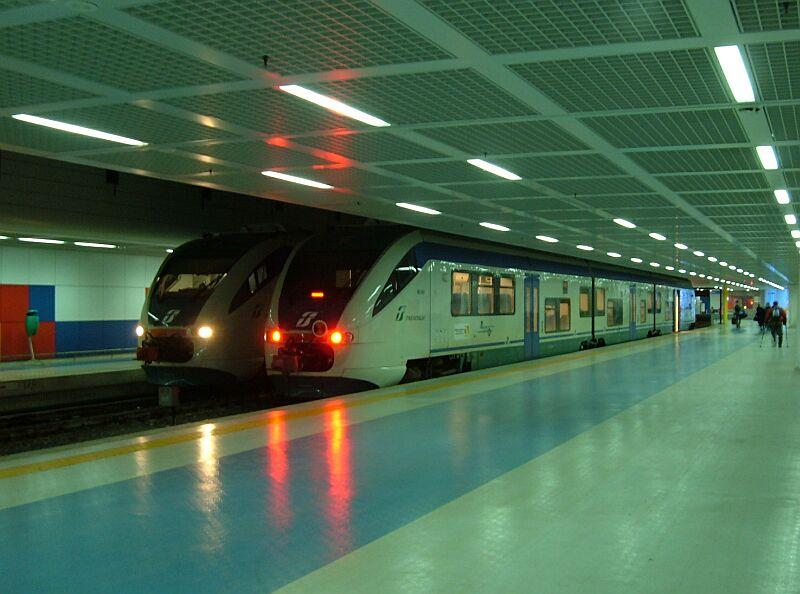
Trains at Punta Raisi

=== Buses ===
Palermo's public bus system is operated by AMAT and covers an area of 340 km (211 mi). About 90 different routes reach every part of the city.

=== Trams ===
Palermo has a public tram system finalized in 2015 and operated by AMAT. There are four lines:

1. Roccella: Central Station
2. Borgo Nuovo: Notarbartolo Station
3. CEP: Notarbartolo Station
4. Corso Calatafimi: Notarbartolo Station

=== Coaches ===
The local coach company, AST, with its coaches totalling 35 lines, links Palermo to all of the main cities in Sicily.

=== Roads ===
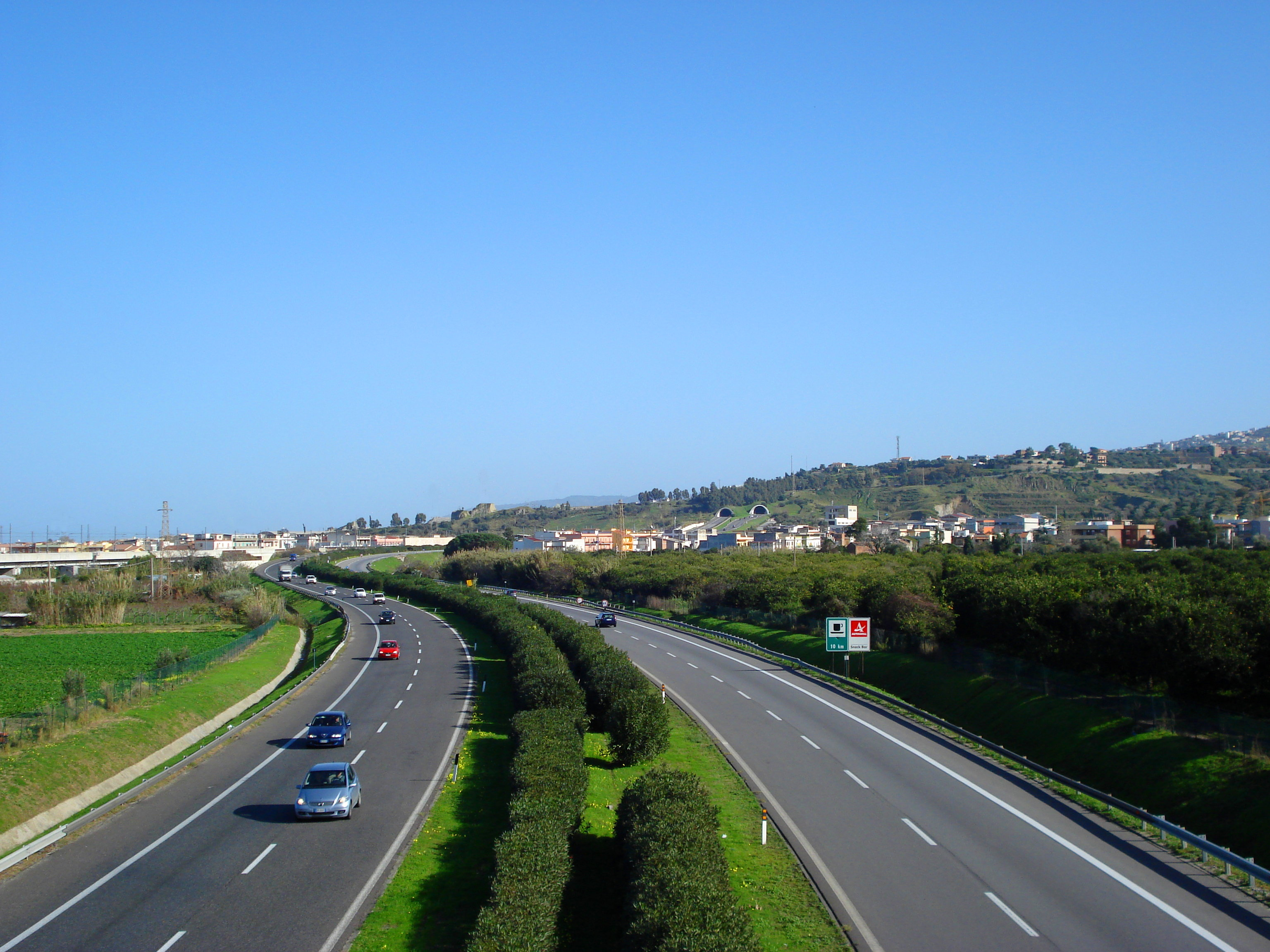
A20 that connects Palermo to Messina

Palermo is a key intersection on the Sicilian road network, being the junction between the eastern A19 motorway to Trapani, the southeastern A29 to airport and Mazara del Vallo and the southwestern A19 to Catania and A20 to Messina. Palermo is one of the main cities on European route E90. The three main national roads starting from Palermo are the SS113, SS121, SS186 and the SS624.

=== Airports ===
Palermo International Airport, known as Falcone-Borsellino Airport (formerly Punta Raisi Airport), is a few kilometres west of Palermo, in Cinisi. It is dedicated to Giovanni Falcone and Paolo Borsellino, two anti-mafia judges killed by the Mafia in the early 1990s.

The airport's rail facility, known as Punta Raisi railway station, can be reached from Palermo Centrale, Palermo Notarbartolo and Palermo Francia railway stations.

Palermo-Boccadifalco Airport is the city's other airport.

=== Railways ===
The main railway station of Palermo is Palermo Centrale which links to the other cities of Sicily, including Agrigento, Trapani and Catania, and through Messina and the strait to the rest of Italy. The railways also connect to the Palermo airport with departures every thirty minutes.

=== Port ===
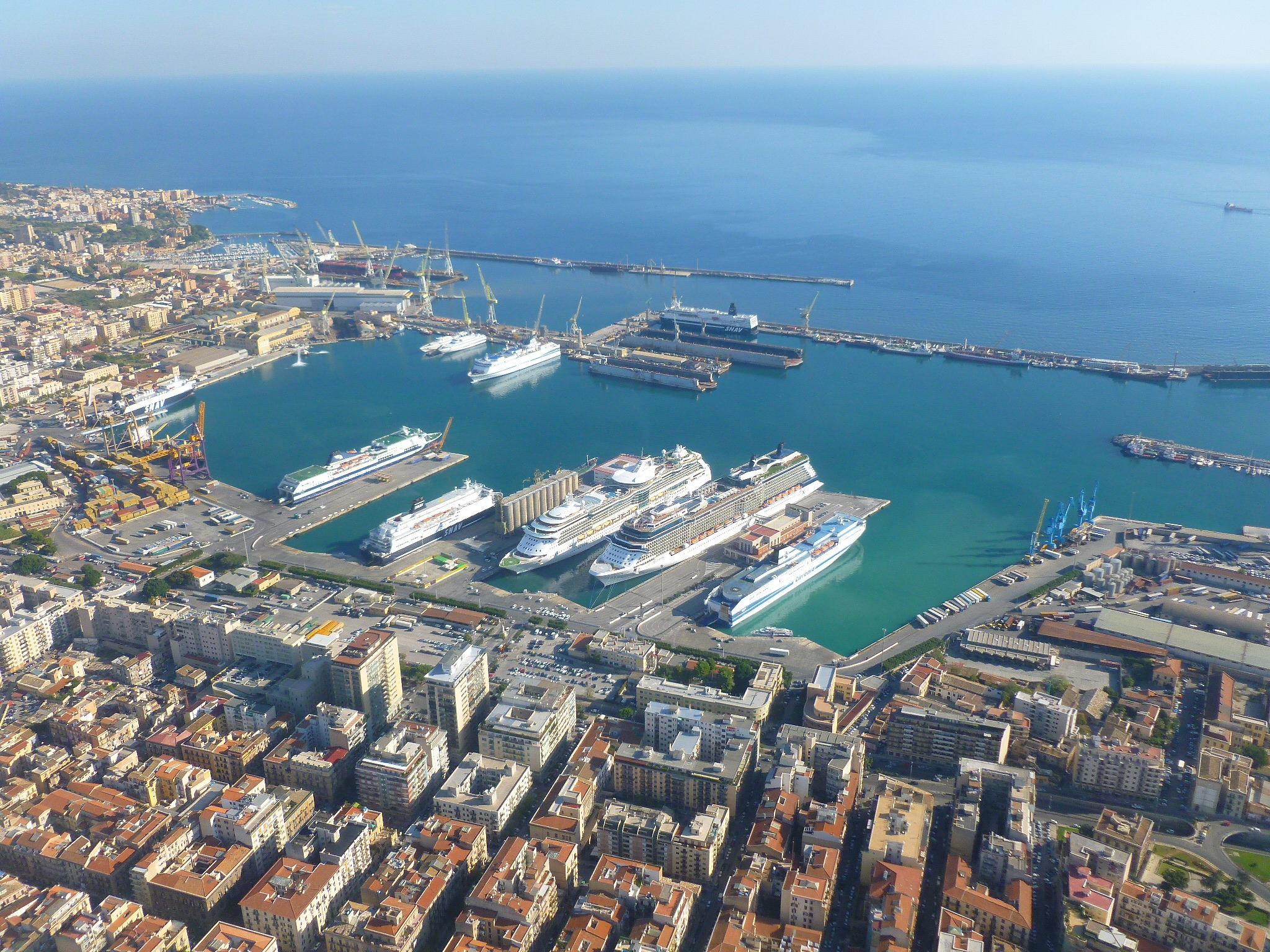
The port of Palermo

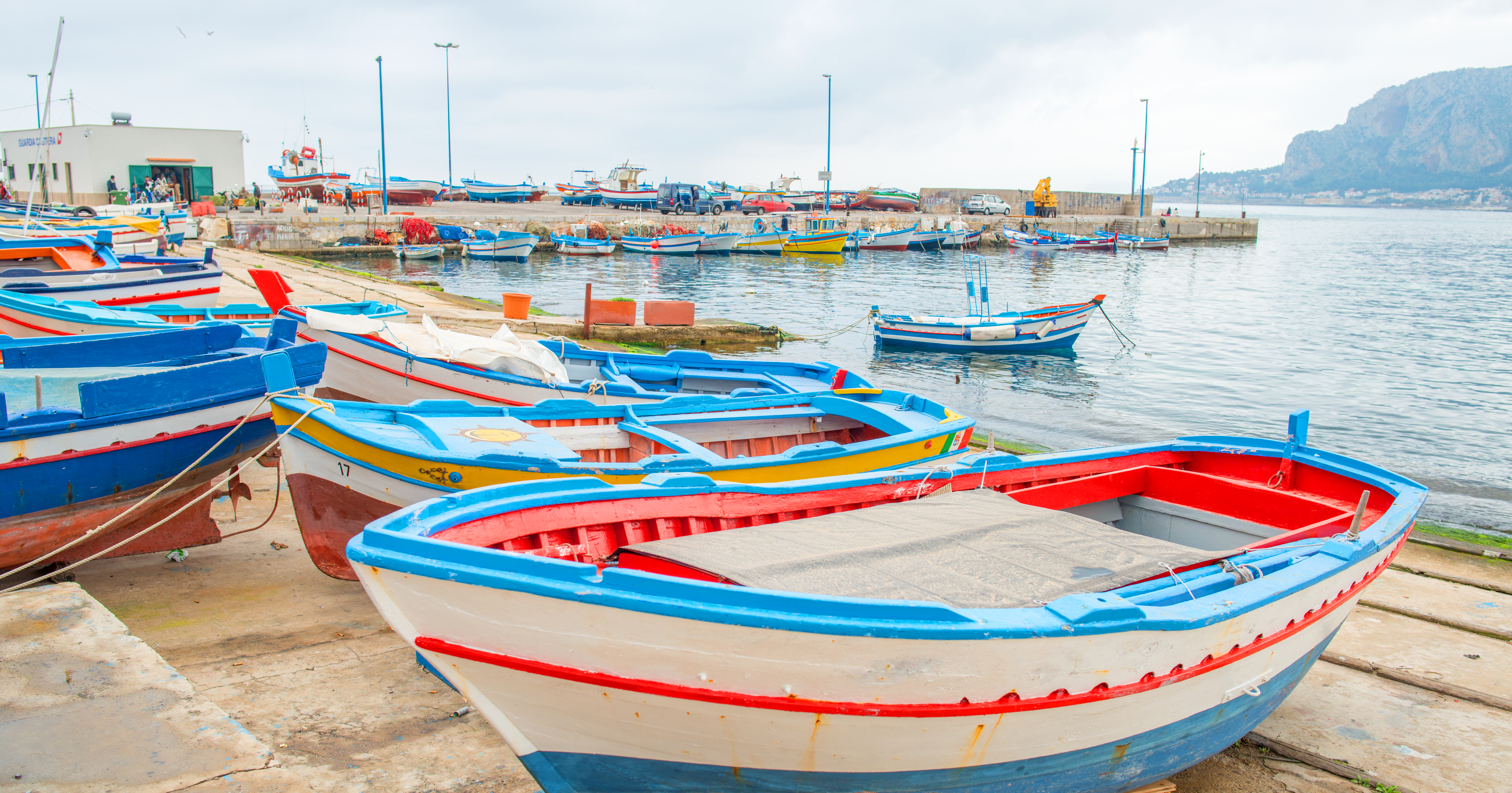

The port of Palermo, founded by the Phoenicians over 2,700 years ago, is, together with the port of Messina, Sicily's main port. From there, ferries link Palermo to Cagliari, Genoa, Livorno, Naples, Tunis, and other cities, and carry almost two million passengers annually. It is also an important port for cruise ships. Traffic includes also almost 5×10^{6} t (5.5×10^{6} short tons) of cargo and 80,000 TEUs yearly. The port also has links to minor Sicilian islands such as Ustica and the Aeolian Islands (via Cefalù in summer). Inside the Port of Palermo there is a section known as "tourist marina" for sailing yachts and catamarans.

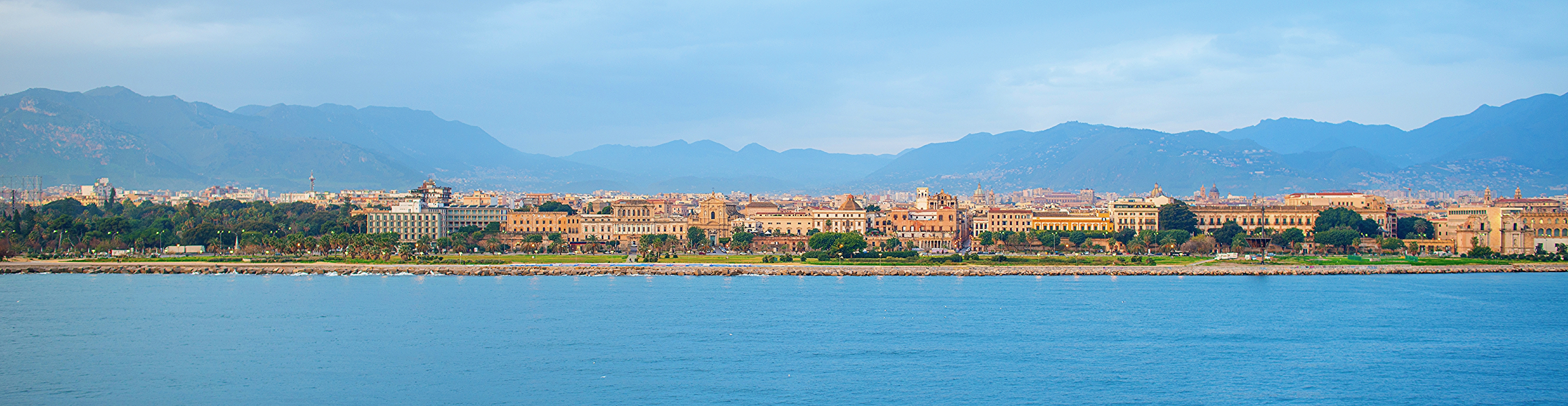

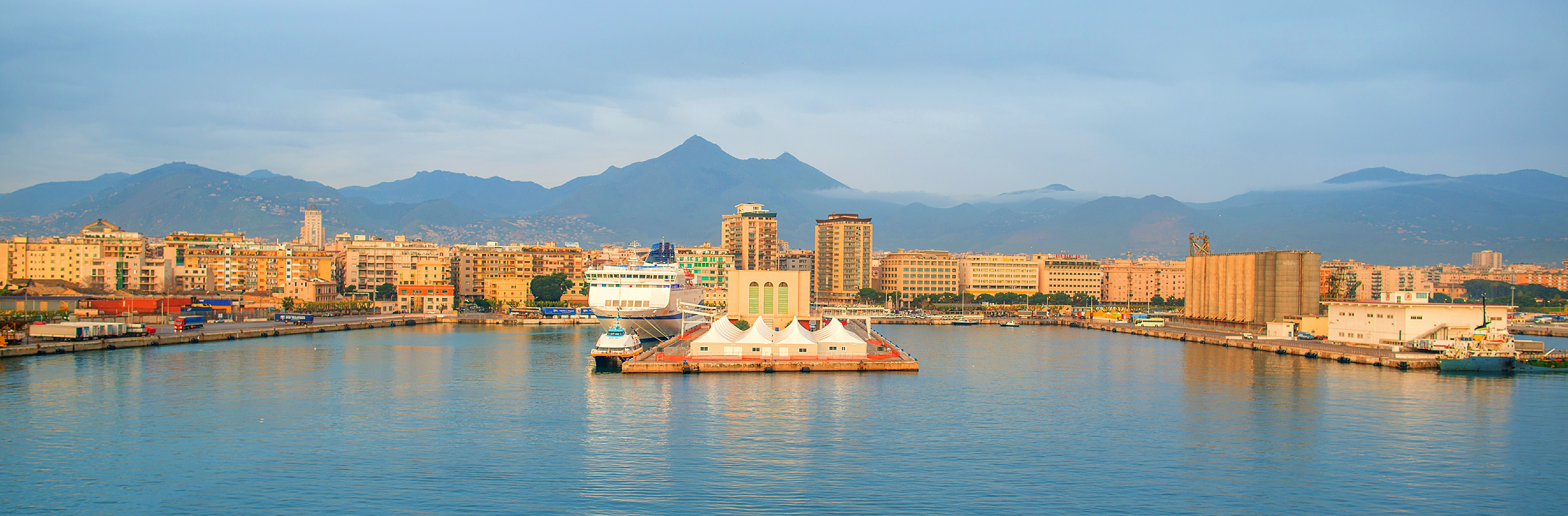

== Education ==
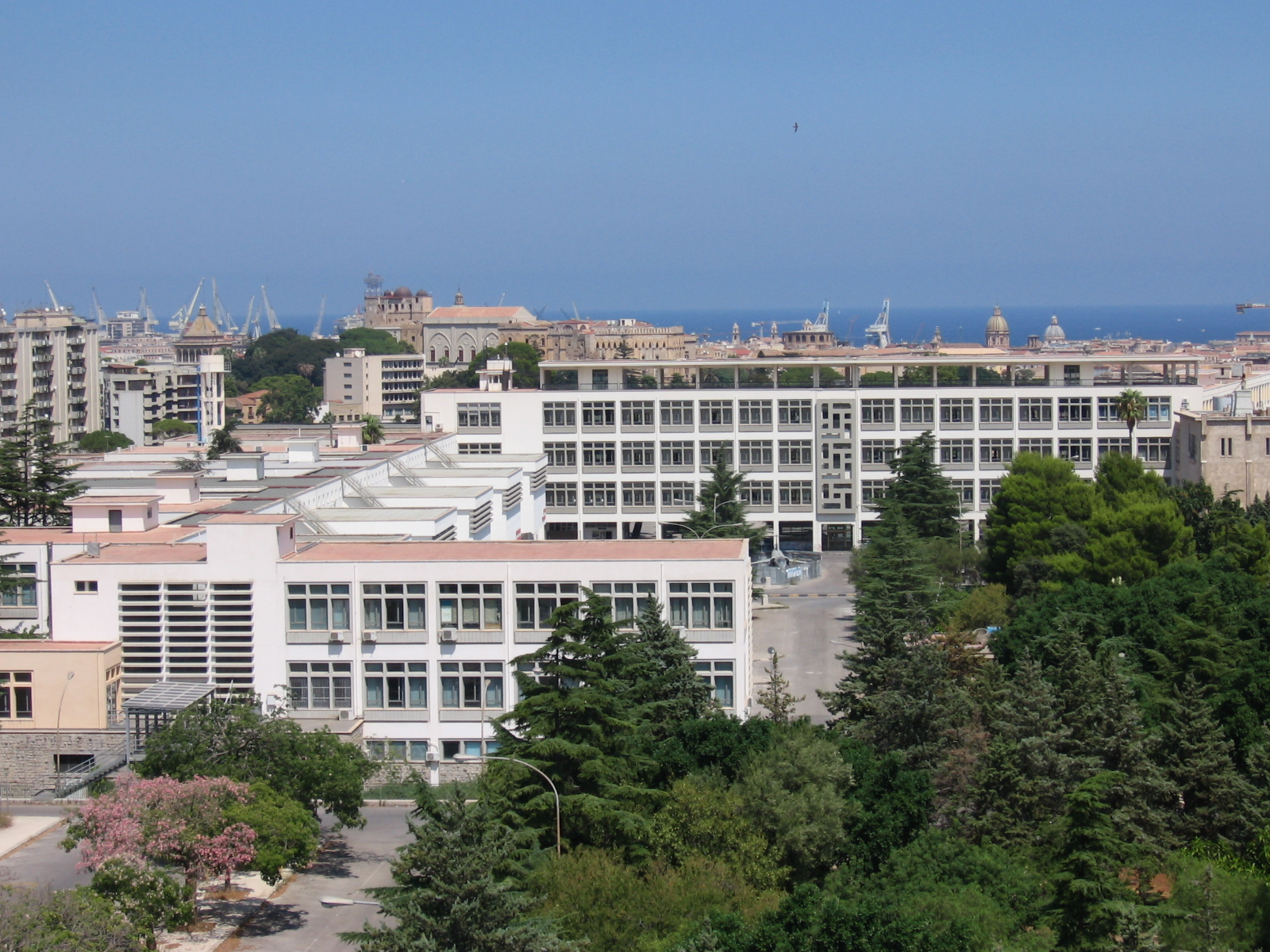
The University of Palermo

The local university is the University of Palermo, the island's second oldest university. It was officially founded in 1806, although historical records indicate that medicine and law have been taught there since the late 15th century. The Orto botanico di Palermo (Palermo botanical gardens) is home to the university's Department of Botany and is also open to visitors.

== International relations ==
=== Twin towns – sister cities ===
Palermo is twinned with:

- Bizerte, Tunisia
- (Democratic Republic of the Congo) Bukavu, DR of the Congo
- Chengdu, China
- Düsseldorf, Germany
- Grand-Bassam, Ivory Coast
- Hanoi, Vietnam
- Khan Yunis, Palestine
- Miami, United States
- Monterey, United States
- Montpellier, France
- Ottawa, Canada
- Palermo, Argentina
- Palermo, Colombia
- Pistoia, Italy
- Samara, Russia
- Santiago de Cuba, Cuba
- Sekondi-Takoradi, Ghana
- Sestu, Italy
- (Georgia (country)) Tbilisi, Georgia
- Timișoara, Romania
- Valletta, Malta
- Yaroslavl, Russia

== Notable people ==
- Fausto Russo Alesi (born 1973), actor
- Eleonora Abbagnato (born 1978), ballet dancer
- Simonetta Agnello Hornby (born 1945), writer
- Dario Aita (born 1987), Italian actor
- Emerico Amari (1810–1870), politician
- Roberto Andò (born 1959), film director
- Vito Artale (1882–1944), general
- Lucio Maria Attinelli (born 1933), journalist and writer
- Aldo Baglio (born 1958), actor
- Pietro Ballo (born 1952), tenor
- Mario Balotelli (born 1990), footballer
- Mario Bardi (1922–1998), painter
- Ernesto Basile (1857–1932), architect
- Letizia Battaglia (1935–2022), photographer, photojournalist and politician
- Ferdinando Beneventano del Bosco (1813–1881), general
- Francesco Benigno (born 1967), actor
- Alfredo Bordonali (born 1919), football player
- Paolo Borsellino (1940–1992), judge
- Paolo Briguglia (born 1974), actor
- Gabriele Bruni (born 1974), sailor
- Gaetano Bruno (born 1973), actor
- Luigi Maria Burruano (1948–2017), actor
- Tommaso Buscetta (1928–2000), pentito of the Sicilian Mafia
- Lando Buzzanca (1935–2022), actor
- Lorena Cacciatore (born 1987), actress
- Alessandro Cagliostro (1743–1795), magician (paranormal) and adventurer
- Phil Caliva (born 1945), American racing driver
- Stanislao Cannizzaro (1826–1910), chemist
- Selene Caramazza (born 1993), actress
- Bruno Caruso (1927–2018), painter, illustrator, graphic designer and political activist
- Pino Caruso (1934–2019), actor
- Francesco Saverio Cavallari (1810-1896), architect and archeologist
- Marco Cecchinato (born 1992), tennis player
- Michelangelo Celesia (1814–1904), Italian cardinal
- Christian (1943-2025), singer
- Federico Cinà (born 2007), tennis player
- Daniele Ciprì (born 1962), film director
- Max Crivello (born 1958), illustrator and painter
- Miriam Dalmazio (born 1987), actress
- Emma Dante (born 1967), playwright and film director
- Alessandro D'Avenia (born 1977), writer
- Evaristo de Chirico (1841-1905), engineer
- Marcello Dell'Utri (born 1941), politician
- Nino Di Matteo (born 1961), judge
- Salvatore Di Vittorio (born 1967), composer and conductor
- Angelo Duro (born 1982), actor
- Pepi Fabbiano (PhD 1973), astrophysicist
- Giovanni Falcone (1939–1992), judge
- Vincenzo Ferrera (born 1973), actor
- Salvatore Ficarra (born 1971), actor
- Luca Flores (1956–1995), pianist and composer
- Ignazio Florio Jr. (1869–1957), entrepreneur
- Ignazio Florio Sr. (1838–1891), entrepreneur
- Vincenzo Florio (1883–1959), entrepreneur
- Corrado Fortuna (born 1978), actor
- Franco Franchi (1928–1992), actor
- Antonello Gagini (1478–1536), sculptor
- Paolo Giaccone (1929-1982), forensic pathologist and professor at the University of Palermo
- Pia Giancaro (born 1950), Italian retired actress
- Natalia Ginzburg (1916-1991), writer
- Claudio Gioè (born 1975), actor
- Filippa Giordano (born 1974), singer
- Laura Giordano (born 1979), lyric soprano
- Marco Glaviano (born 1942), photographer and architect
- Luca Guadagnino (born 1971), film director
- Lucia Guzzardi (born 1927), actress
- Ciccio Ingrassia (1922–2003), actor
- Ugo La Malfa (1903–1979), politician
- Elio Lo Cascio (born 1948), historian
- Luigi Lo Cascio (born 1967), actor
- Rosalia Lombardo (1918–1920), known as the Sleeping Beauty
- Enrico Lo Verso (born 1964), actor
- Louise of Orléans (1812–1850), Queen of The Belgians
- Maria Christina of the Two Sicilies (1806–1878), Queen of Spain
- Filippo Mancuso (1922–2011), magistrate and Italian Minister of Justice
- Teresa Mannino (born 1970), actress
- Franco Maresco (born 1958), film director
- Laura Mattarella (born 1967), first child and the only daughter of Sergio Mattarella
- Sergio Mattarella (born 1941), president of Italy
- Giovanni Meli (1740–1815), poet and playwright
- Pino Mercanti (1911–1986), film director
- Silvio Micali (born 1954), computer scientist
- Gabriele Minì (born 2005), racing driver
- Tommaso di Maria Allery Monterosato (1841–1927), malacologist, born and died in Palermo
- Vittorio Emanuele Orlando (1860–1952), Prime Minister of Italy
- Giorgia Pedone (born 2004), tennis player
- Giovanni Pernice (born 1990), dancer
- Sophia Petrillo (born 1905), character on The Golden Girls
- Valentino Picone (born 1971), actor
- Pif (television host) (born 1972), actor and film director
- Amelia Pinto (1876–1946), opera singer
- Giuseppe Pitrè (1841–1916), folklorist, medical doctor, professor and senator
- Pope Sergius I (650–701)
- Isabella Ragonese (born 1981), actress
- Desirée Rancatore (born 1977), coloratura soprano
- Eva Riccobono (born 1983), model
- Antonio Rinaldi (1709–1794), architect
- Gianni Riotta (born 1954), journalist
- Giuni Russo (1951–2004), singer
- Mario Rutelli (1859-1941), sculptor
- Francesco Sabatini (1721–1797), architect
- Alfredo Salafia (1869–1933), embalmer and taxidermist
- Pietro Scaglione (1906–1971), magistrate
- Alessandro Scarlatti (1660–1725), composer
- Renato Schifani (born 1950), President of the Senate
- Salvatore Schillaci (born 1964), footballer
- Francesco Scianna (born 1982), actor
- Samuele Segreto (born 2004), dancer and actor
- Enzo Sellerio (1924–2012), photographer, publisher and collector
- Giacomo Serpotta (1656–1732), sculptor
- Giuseppe Serpotta (1653–1719), scultore
- Marcello Sorgi (born 1955), journalist
- Tony Sperandeo (born 1953), actor
- Antonio Starabba, Marchese di Rudinì (1839–1908), Prime Minister of Italy
- Gaetano Starrabba (born 1932), racing driver
- Myriam Sylla (born 1995),volleyball player
- Nino Terzo (1923-2005), actor
- Thony (born 1982), singer and actress
- Agostino Todaro (1818–1892), botanist
- Giuseppe Tomasi di Lampedusa (1896–1957), writer
- Giusto Traina (born 1959), historian
- Nino Vaccarella (1933–2021), racing driver
- Delia Vaccarello (1960–2019), journalist and activist for LGBT rights
- Fulco di Verdura (1898–1978), duke and jeweller

=== Honorary citizens ===
People awarded the honorary citizenship of Palermo are:

Date	Name	Notes
17 May 1996	Tenzin Gyatso	The 14th Dalai Lama
14 December 2015	Abdullah Öcalan	Founder of Kurdistan Workers' Party
21 August 2018	Albert II, Prince of Monaco	Prince of Monaco

== See also ==
- Circolo Matematico di Palermo
- Hugo Falcandus
- List of mayors of Palermo
- Outline of Palermo
