= Palazzo dei Normanni =

Palace in Palermo, Italy

UNESCO World Heritage Site
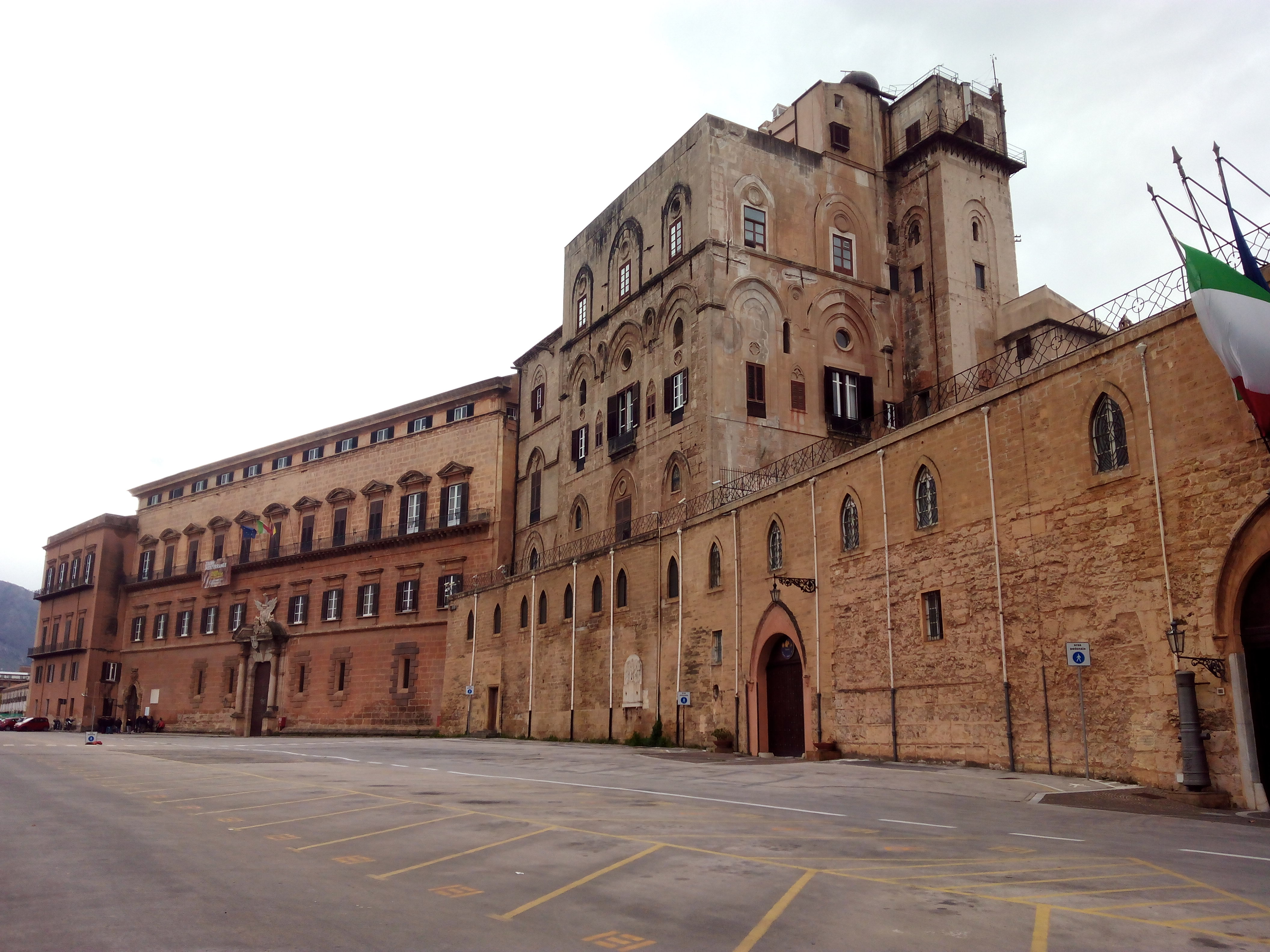
- Main façade of the Norman Palace, facing Piazza del Parlamento

- Location within Sicily Location within Italy
- Official name: Royal Palace
- Location: Palermo, Sicily, Italy
- Part of: Arab-Norman Palermo and the Cathedral Churches of Cefalù and Monreale
- Criteria: Cultural: (ii), (iv)
- Reference: 1487-001
- Inscription: 2015 (39th Session)
- Coordinates: 38°06′39″N 13°21′11″E

The Palazzo dei Normanni (transl. 'Palace of the Normans'; Sicilian: Palazzu dî Nurmanni), also called Royal Palace of Palermo (Italian: Palazzo Reale di Palermo; Sicilian: Palazzu Riali), is a palace in Palermo, Sicily, Italy. It was the seat of the Kings of Sicily with the Hauteville dynasty and served afterwards as the main seat of power for the subsequent rulers of Sicily. Since 1946 it has been the seat of the Sicilian Regional Assembly. The building is the oldest royal residence in Europe; and was the private residence of the rulers of the Kingdom of Sicily and the imperial seat of Frederick II and Conrad IV.

== History ==
The palace was built on the highest point of the city, above a Punic structure discovered in 1984 beneath the Duke of Montalto Halls. During Arab rule, the earliest nucleus of the building arose between the rivers Kemonia and Papireto, designed with defensive features typical of fortresses. This building was also used during the Roman Byzantine era.

Following the Norman conquest in 1072, the Normans built a new building consisting of a castle, with the function of royal residence and administrative hub. In 1130, after the coronation of Roger II of Altavilla—the first Norman king of Sicily—the Palatine Chapel was constructed, becoming a symbol of Norman culture and religion.

The palace's core was marked by four towers and included facilities such as workshops and textile laboratories (nobiles officinae or tiraz). It served as the seat of successive Norman courts, including those of Roger II, William I (known as "the Mean"), and William II ("the Good"), who oversaw a confluence of diverse cultures.

Frederick II, grandson of Roger II and son of Henry VI of Hohenstaufen and Constance of Altavilla, continued this legacy. He played a pivotal role in its administration and in fostering cultural life, notably supporting the Sicilian School of poetry.

After a period of decline during the Angevin and Aragonese rule, the palace was revitalized under the Spanish viceroys in the late 16th century. This phase saw the addition of new architectural elements with both representative and military functions, including the Fountain Courtyard (1584) and the Maqueda Courtyard (1600).

During the Bourbon period, the palace saw further development, particularly in the decoration of the Hercules Hall. Today, the Royal Palace serves as the seat of the Sicilian Regional Assembly.

=== Cappella Palatina ===
The palace contains the Cappella Palatina, the best example of the Norman–Arab–Byzantine style that prevailed in the 12th-century Sicily. The mosaics, the wooden roof, elaborately fretted and painted, and the marble incrustation of the lower part of the walls and the floor are very fine. Of the palace itself, the greater part was rebuilt and added in Aragonese times, but there are some other parts of Roger's work left, specially the hall called Sala Normanna.

== Gallery ==
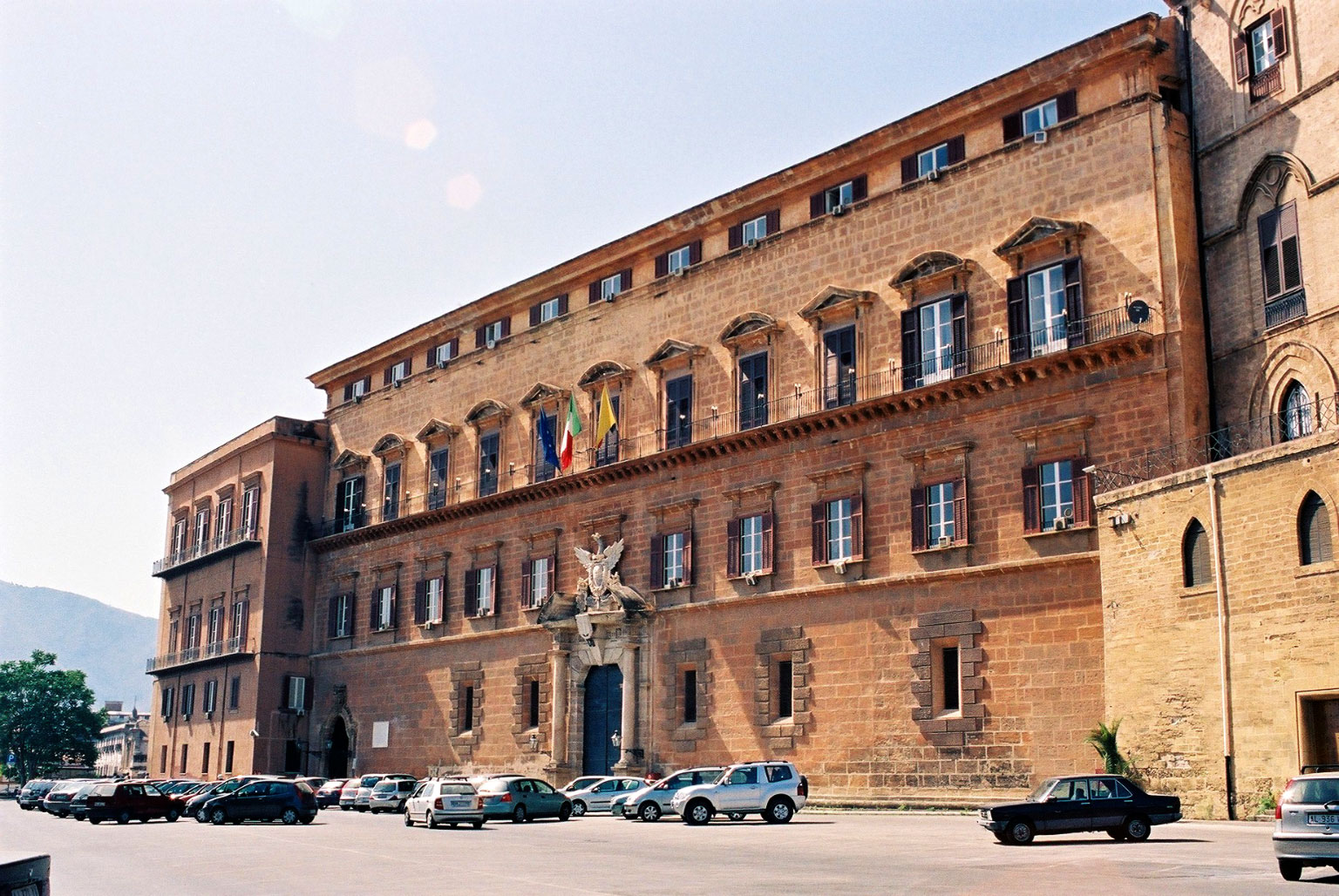
Seat of the Sicilian Regional Assembly

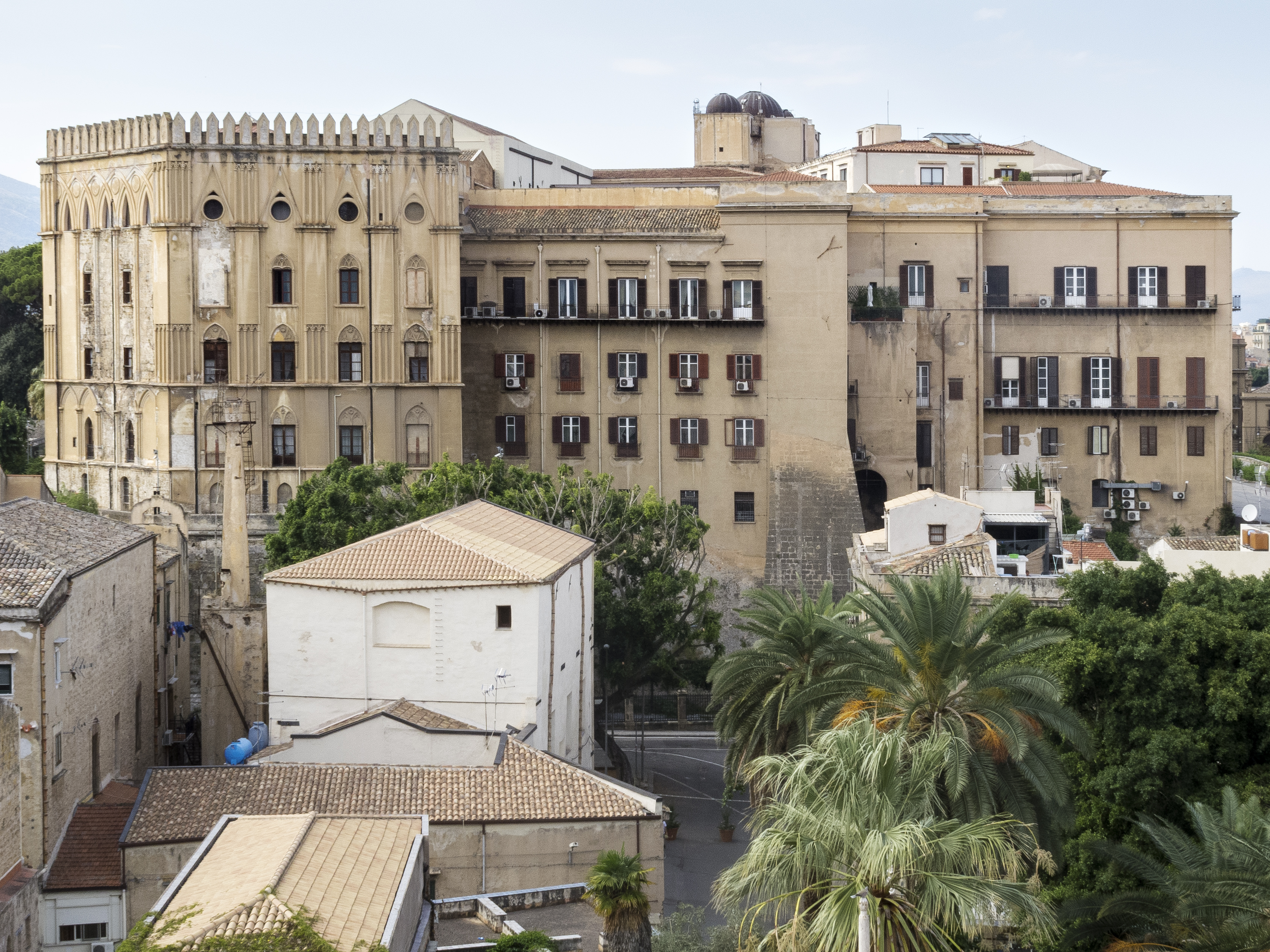
A side view of the Palace

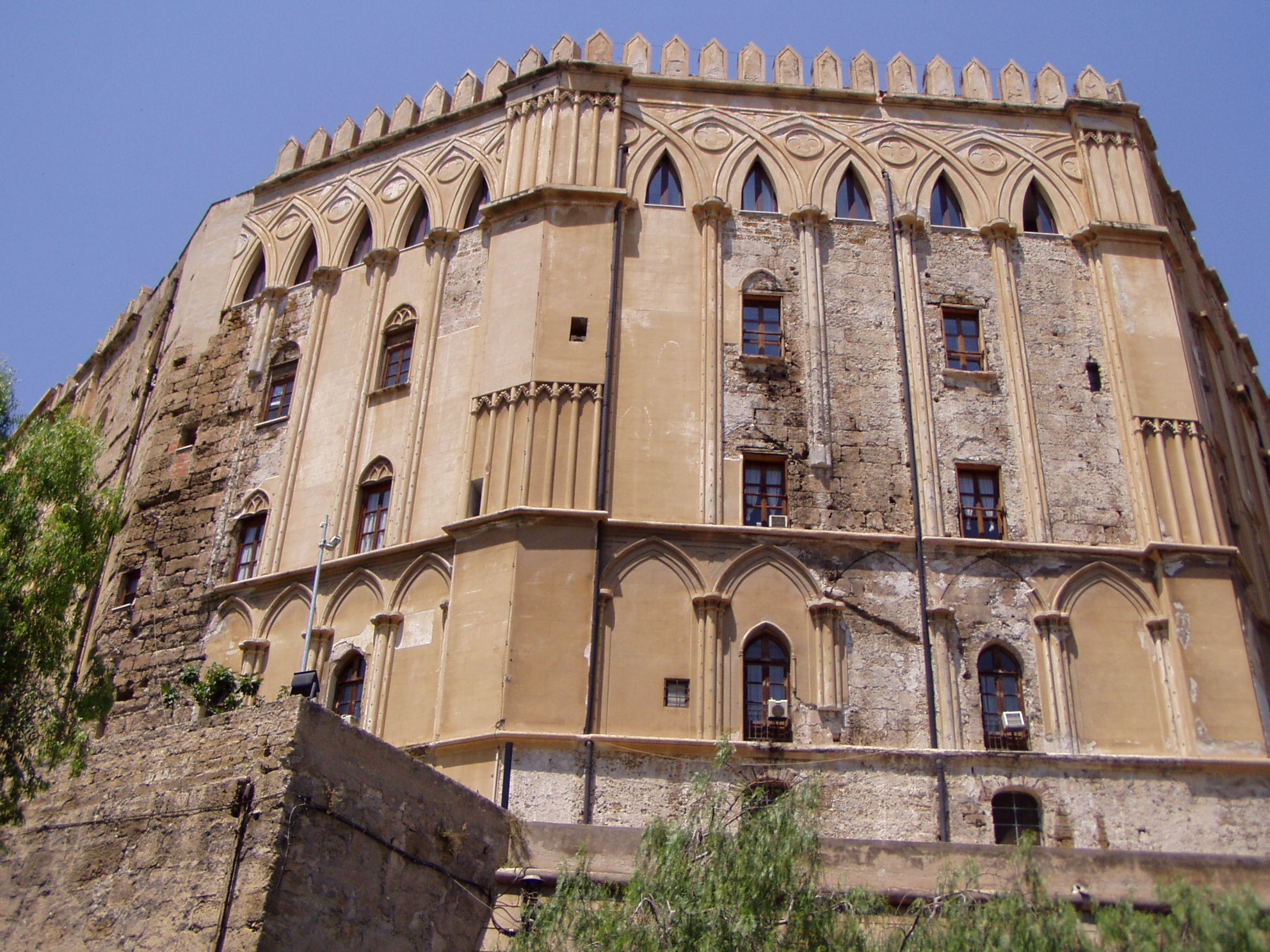
Side wall of the Palace

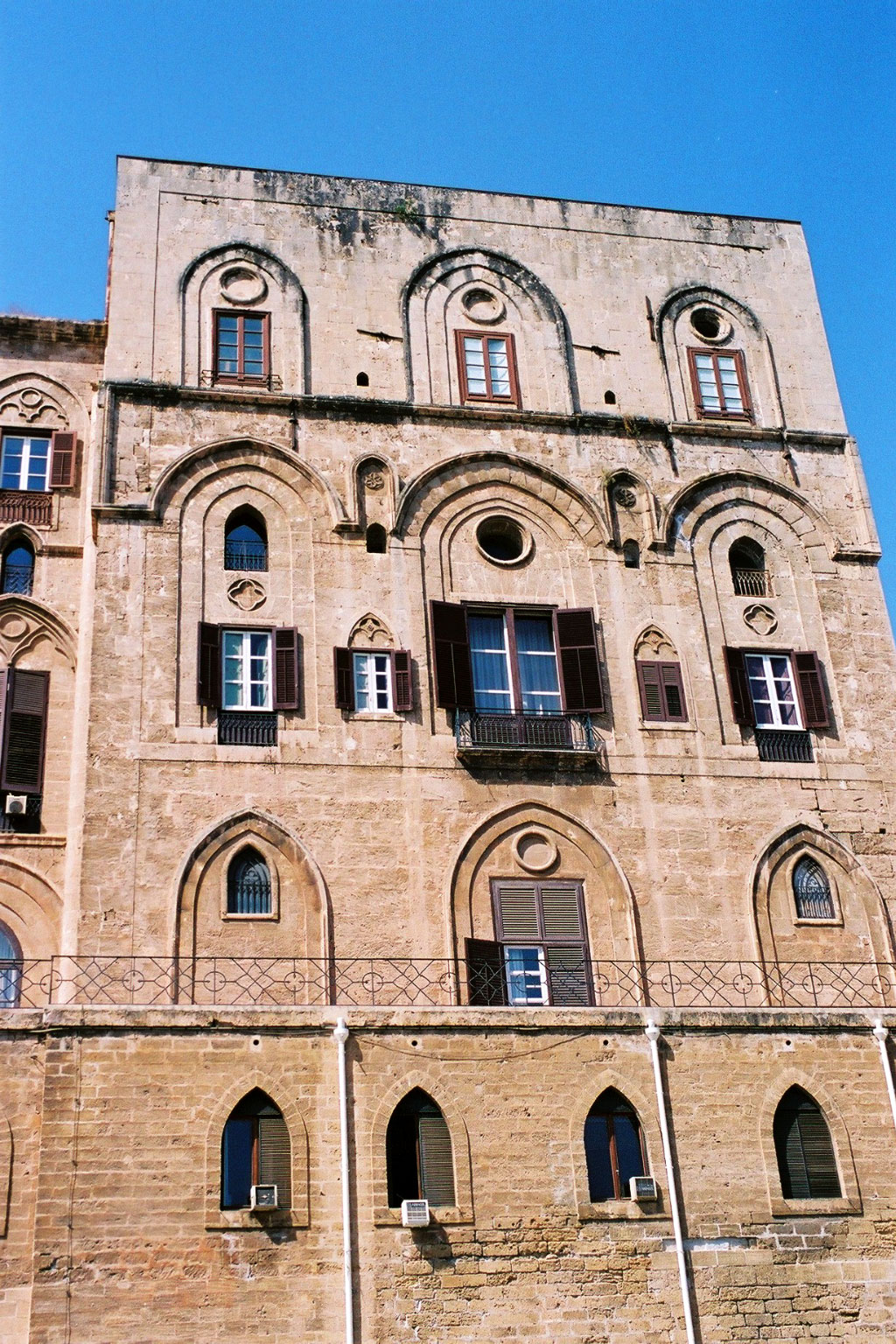
Norman wing

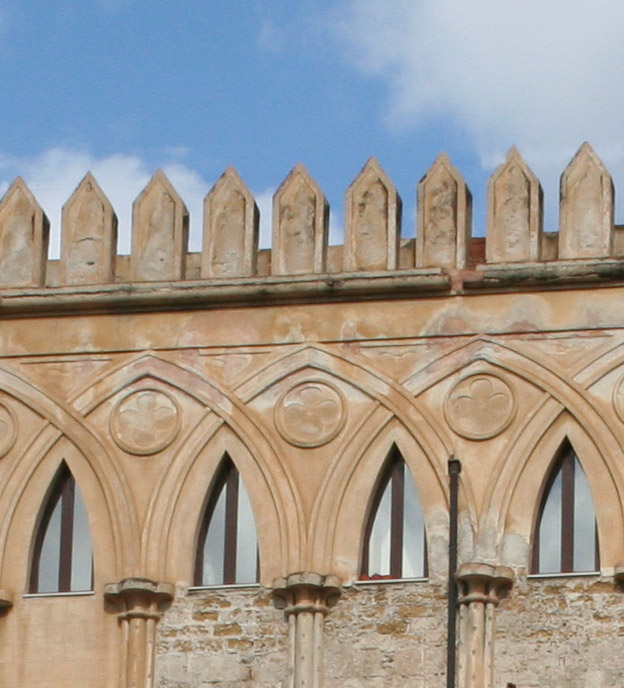
Detail

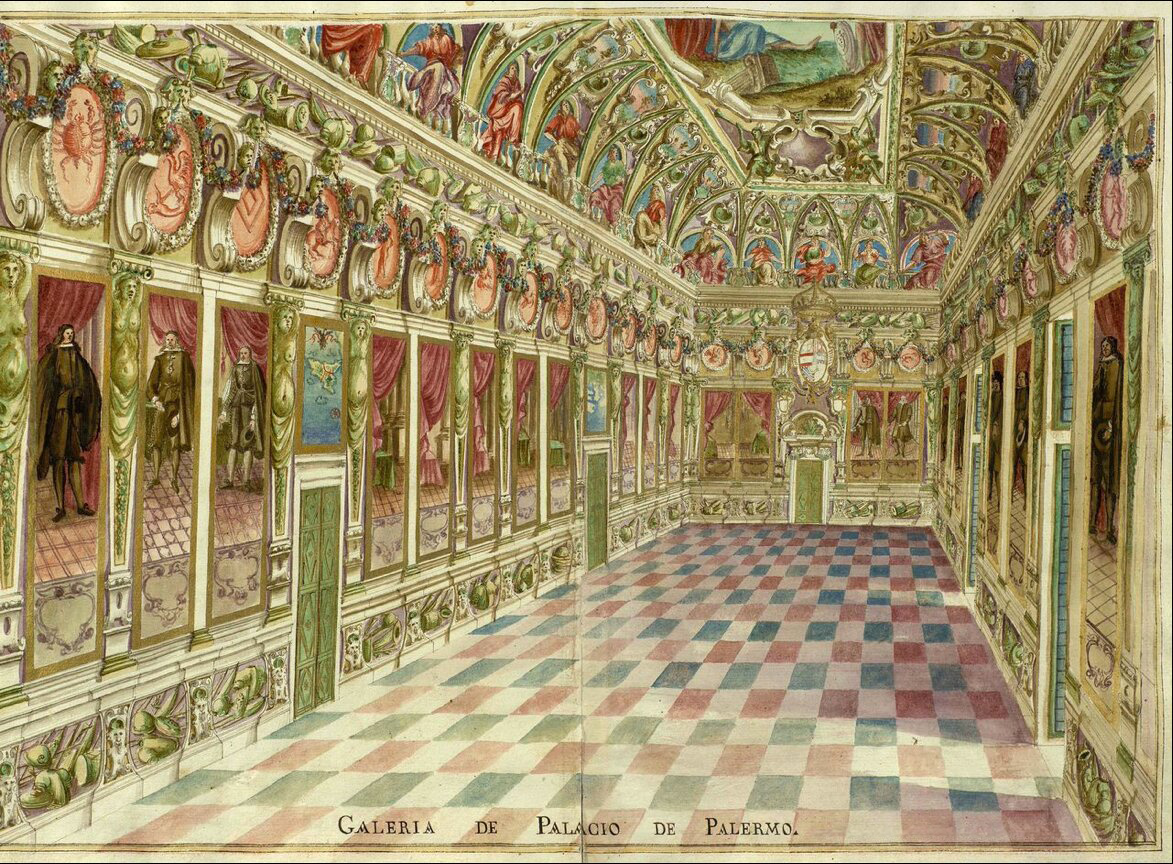
The Gallery of the Palace in 1686

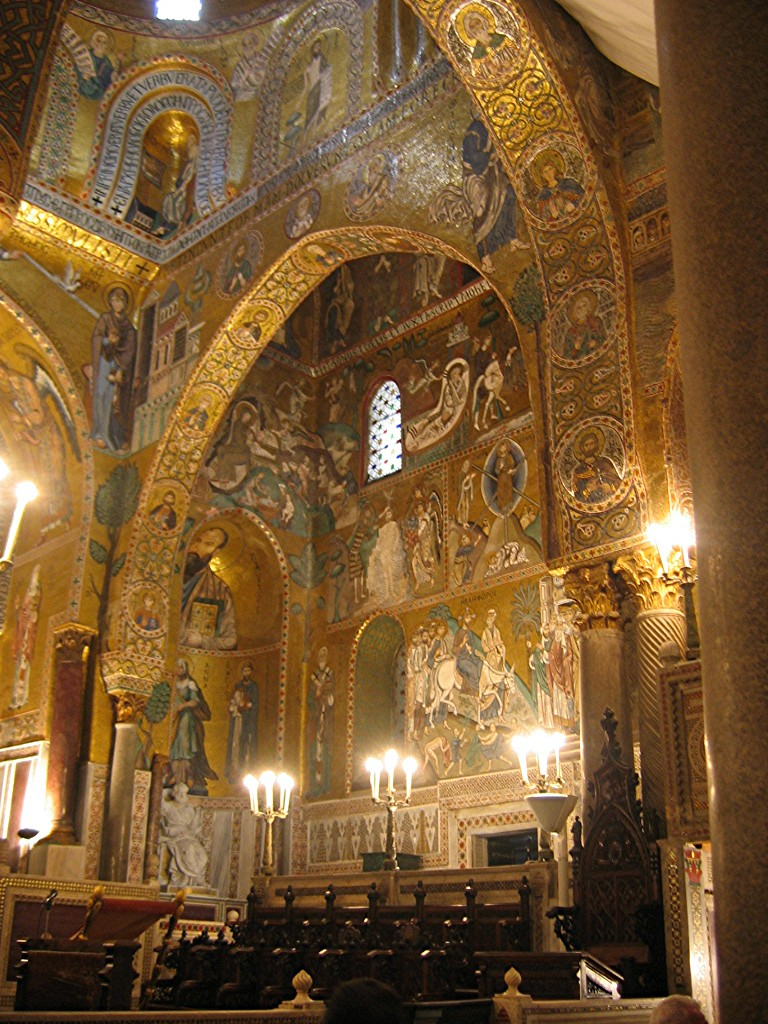
Cappella Palatina

== See also ==
- Arab-Norman Palermo and the Cathedral Churches of Cefalù and Monreale
- Cathedral of Monreale
- Cathedral of Cefalù
