= Cappella Palatina =

Royal chapel in Palermo, Sicily

Coordinates: 38°06′39″N 13°21′13″E

View of the main dome and apse

The Palatine Chapel /ˈpælətaɪn ˈtʃæpəl/ (Italian: Cappella Palatina) is the royal chapel of the Norman Palace in Palermo, Sicily. This building is a mixture of Byzantine, Norman, and Fatimid architectural styles, showing the tricultural state of Sicily during the 12th century after Roger I and Robert Guiscard conquered the island.

Also referred to as a Palace church or Palace chapel, it was commissioned by Roger II of Sicily in 1132 to be built upon an older chapel (now the crypt) constructed around 1080. It took eight years to build, receiving a royal charter the same year, with the mosaics being only partially finished by 1143. The sanctuary, dedicated to Saint Peter, is reminiscent of a domed basilica. It has three apses, as is usual in Byzantine architecture, with six pointed arches (three on each side of the central nave) resting on recycled classical columns. The muqarnas ceiling of the nave and the chapel's rectilinear form show the Fatimid influence in the building's construction.

The Palatine Chapel forms part of the UNESCO-listed site "Arab-Norman Palermo and the Cathedral Churches of Cefalù and Monreale", recognized in 2015.

== Mosaics ==
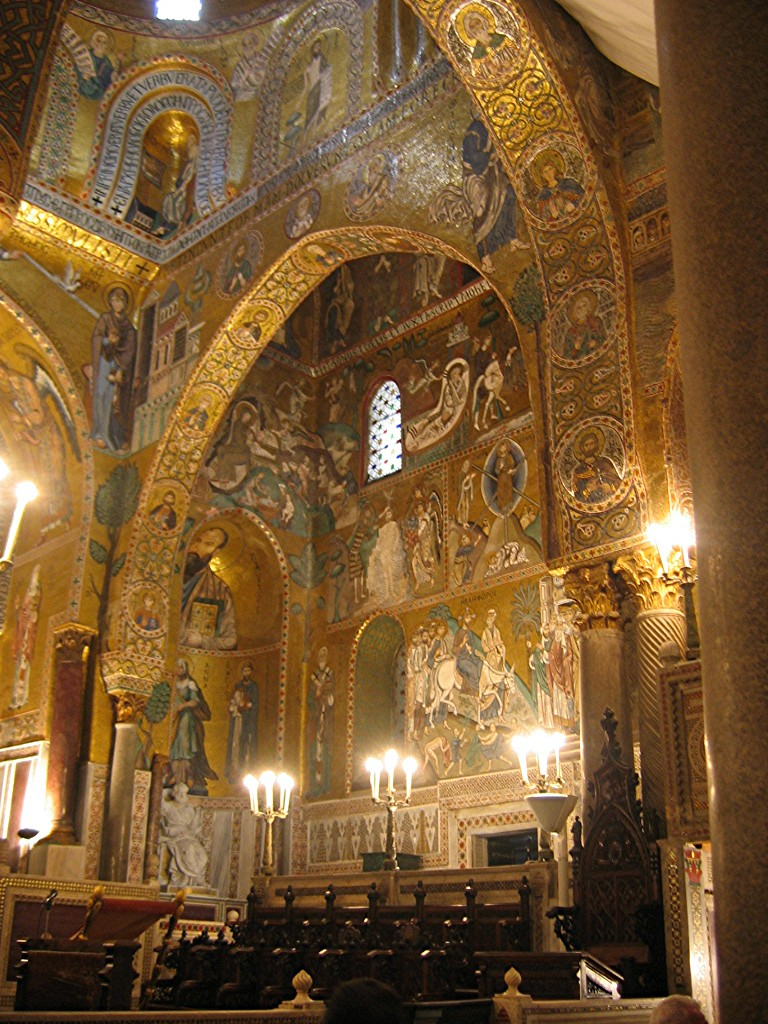
Fatimid arches and Byzantine mosaics complement each other within the Palatine Chapel.

The mosaics of the Palatine Chapel are of unparalleled elegance as concerns elongated proportions and streaming draperies of figures. They are also noted for subtle modulations of colour and luminance. The oldest are probably those covering the ceiling, the drum, and the dome. The shimmering mosaics of the transept, presumably dating from the 1140s and attributed to Byzantine artists, with an illustrated scene, along the north wall, of St. John in the desert and a landscape of Agnus Dei. Below this are five saints, the Greek fathers of the church, St. Gregory of Nissa, St. Gregory the Theologian, St. Basil, St. John Chrysostom and St. Nicholas. The three central figures, St. Gregory, St. Basil, and St. John Chrysostom, are the Three Great Orthodox Church Fathers referred to as the Three Hierarchs, which originated fifty years earlier. Every composition is set within an ornamental frame, not dissimilar to that used in contemporaneous mosaic icons.

The rest of the mosaics, dated to the 1160s or the 1170s, are executed in a cruder manner and feature Latin (rather than Greek) inscriptions. Probably a work of local craftsmen, these pieces are more narrative and illustrative than transcendental. A few mosaics have a secular character and represent oriental flora and fauna. This may be the only substantial passage of secular Byzantine mosaic extant today.

== Muqarnas ceiling ==
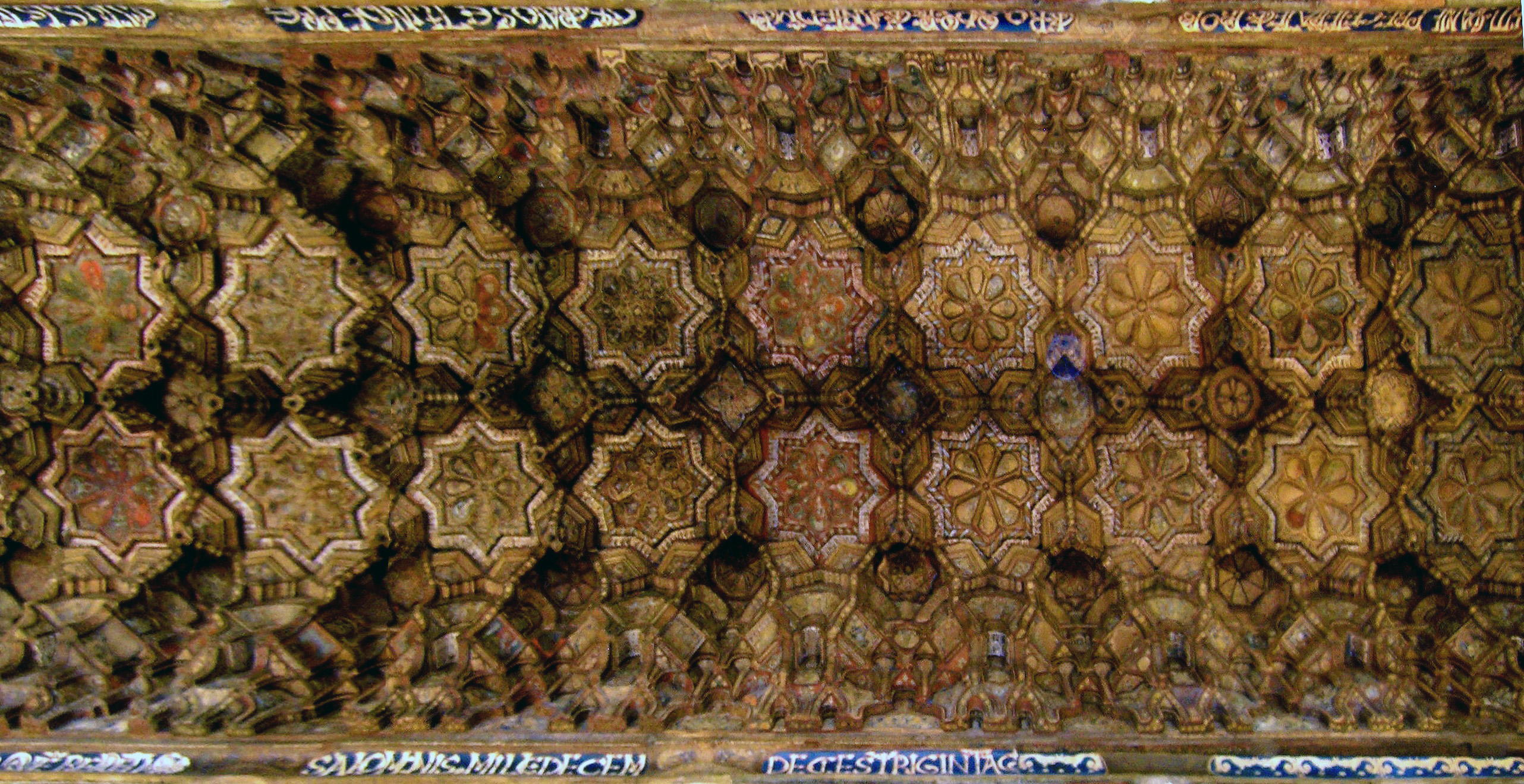
Muqarnas in the Cappella Palatina

The intricate and striking muqarnas that still exist in Italy are all in Palermo, mostly in the Zisa Palace and Capella Palatina. They are also a rare case of non-Islamic manifestations. They appeared in Sicily suddenly, meaning that a system as sophisticated as this one was likely imported from elsewhere. Scholars are not confident about where this art derives from, but theories range from North Africa, Egypt, Syria, Persia, or even locally. Some call upon the similarities between Zirid architecture fragments from the Qal'a Beni Hammad in Algeria and the Cappella Palatina roofs as examples of North African roots. There are also muqarnas in Tunisia that resemble the Capella Palatina. Another potential source is Syria where the earliest muqarnas are from the 12th century in Aleppo. Up to a dozen Syrian muqarnas styles resemble the Sicilian examples. The primary demerit to this theory is the fact that the Sicilian muqarnas precede their Syrian counterparts by 30 years. Some also believe the muqarnas came from the Fatimids in Egypt. There was potentially a period of unrest in Cairo and a lack of patronage for the arts, prompting Fatimid artists to flee to Sicily. Scholars theorize this encouraged collaboration between the Sicilians and Fatimids – who introduced muqarnas. There is a newer theory that skilled Islamic craftsmen already existed in Sicily and were responsible for the muqarnas. This is based on the evidence that the Sicilian muqarnas vary significantly enough from any Islamic counterparts. However, the leading theory is that the Fatimids are the originators of the Sicilian muqarnas, but there is a lack of tangible evidence. At the most, there is some written correspondence between Norman Palermo and the Fatimids, but this does not mention artisans or trading of styles. Therefore, the origins of muqarnas in Sicily are still unclear.

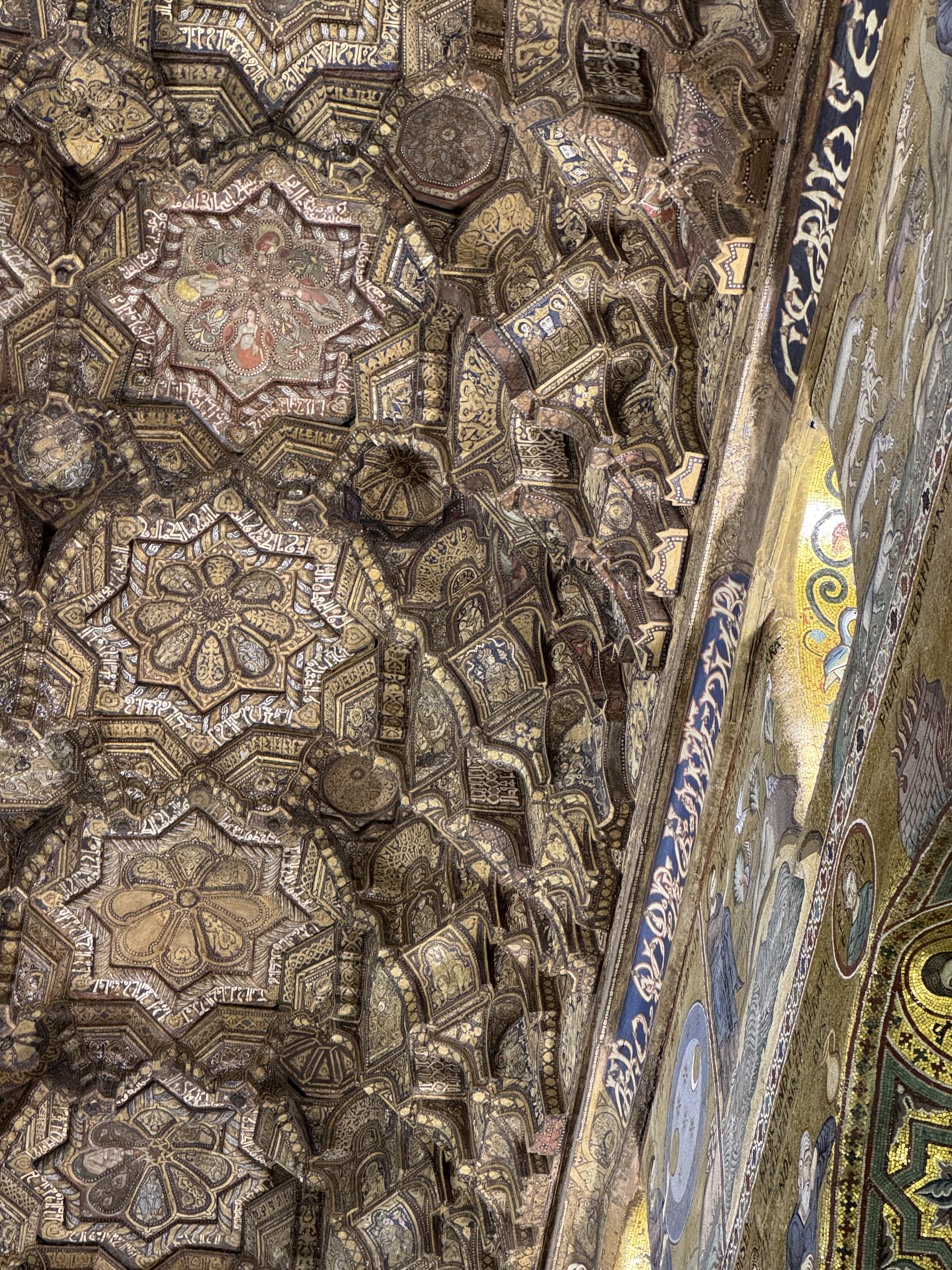
Muqarnas in the Cappella Palatina

The muqarnas ceiling surmounts the three-aisled basilica hall in the western part of the building. The ceiling represents the cultural diversity of Roger II's kingdom and his ability to unify the land around him. Some scholars also claim that Roger had the ceiling constructed of wood to allude to Solomon's palace in Jerusalem, therefore claiming a divine right to rule. The iconography helps reinforce Roger and the Norman dynasty's royalty. The art is related to the Islamic vision of eternal paradise, implying that the Norman Kings were the most eminent representatives of heaven on earth. The ceiling represents the relationship between Mediterranean and Islamic traditions through inscriptions, iconography, and geometry.

There are approximately 75 inscriptions serving as invocations of regal power. They are blessings of praise and good wishes for power, prosperity, goodness, health, and beyond. Many of these inscriptions are in Kufic script – emphasizing the potential Fatimid origins who used this script. The inscriptions were hard to read because of the overlying art and intricate geometry of the muqarnas. However, viewers could discern a word or two that could trigger a verse from the Quran.

The iconography of muqarnas continues to emphasize the idea of paradise in heaven and on Earth. The images refer to the pleasures and habits in the king's court. There are hunters, drinkers, dancers, and musicians adorning the wall. Interestingly, the images on the ceiling do not create any coherent narrative. On the muqarnas ceiling's eastern end, there is an image of revelers singing, dancing, and drinking. These appear to be part of a banquet honoring the patrons of the royal chapel. These individuals are carrying special drinking chalices which appear all over the muqarnas. Then, on the 3rd register on either side of the exact center of the south muqarnas, there are two paintings of crowned rulers. One of these is Roger II. There are also some Christian scenes on the muqarnas, but they portray everyday life situations not necessarily religious ones. In addition, the muqarnas celebrate battles, hunts, and all sorts of animals including elephants, deer, ibexes, gazelles, and antelopes. In Arab literature, animals serve as metaphors and possess layered meanings. The Cappella Palatina is the earliest surviving example of wooden muqarnas. The construction of muqarnas constructed in wood likely began from this building given all previous examples are made of bricks or stones. The muqarnas ceiling was built most likely after the mosaics of the nave ordered by William I. The wooden components are all incredibly small – ranging between 1 and 1.5 centimetres (0.4 and 0.6 in). Each piece is fitted together and reinforced with fiber bindings held together with animal glue. The ceiling is supported by horizontal cavetto wood moldings that touch the upper part of the windows and has longitudinal and transverse symmetry. It is composed of a central horizontal field with a star-and-cross pattern. The muqarnas has 5 horizontal tiers that allow a smooth transition from the ceiling to the walls of the nave. The main features of the ceiling are 20 eight-pointed stars which are formed by overlaying two squares rotated at 45-degree angles. These stars are inscribed within octagons separated by rhomboidal bosses. Smaller octagonal eight-pointed sears are placed between the stars and frame. There is an interplay of spatial volumes and planes with bold structural outlines that bend and manipulate light. The muqarnas serve no structural purpose; they are suspended beneath the exterior roof with more wood.

== Chapel ==
Cappella Palatina in Palermo, Sicily

The chapel combines harmoniously a variety of styles: the Norman architecture and door decor, the Arabic arches and ceiling designs and script adorning the roof, the Byzantine dome and mosaics. For instance, clusters of four eight-pointed stars, typical for Muslim design, are arranged on the ceiling so as to form a Christian cross.

The Cappella Palatina is built along an east–west axis. On the west side resides the throne platform and on the east side is the sanctuary with the nave connecting these two sides, with domes over each side. Along the northern wall of the sanctuary is the royal balcony and the northern chapel, where the King would watch and listen to the liturgy on special feast days. Along the nave runs two rows of colonnades, with windows in between each colonnade. The chapel was decorated with gold, pearls, porphyry, silk and marble.

The chapel has been considered a union of a Byzantine church sanctuary and a Western basilica nave. The sanctuary, is of an "Eastern" artistic nature, while the nave reflects "Western" influences.

== Nave ==
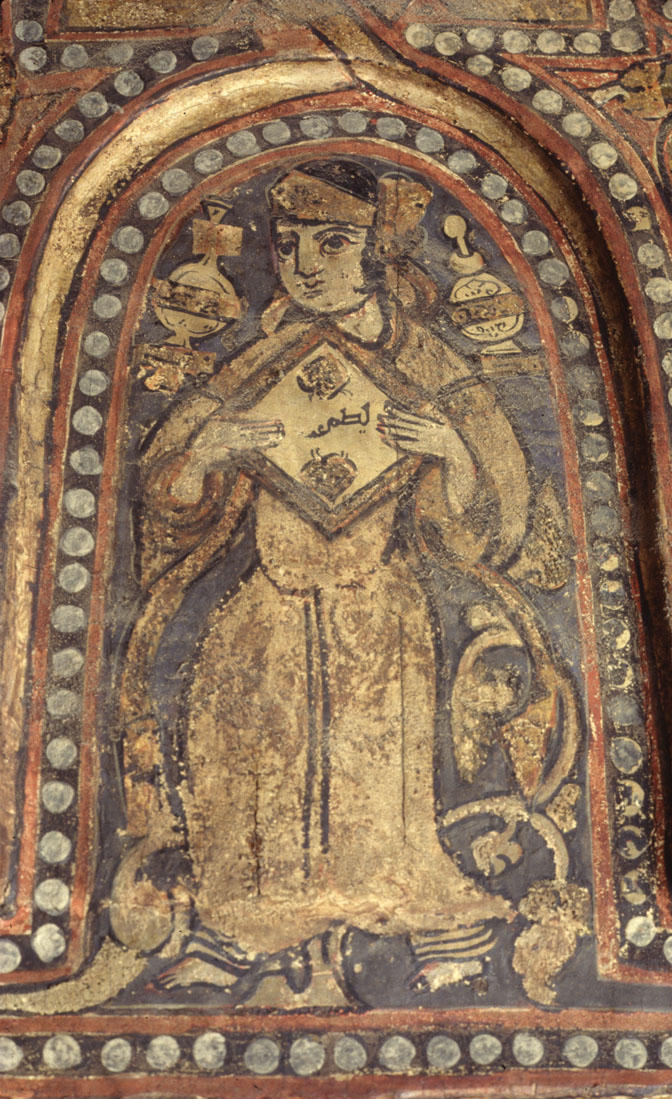
woman wearing Muslim clothes with an adufe percussion instrument with Arabic inscription

The nave, constructed under Roger II, did not contain any Christian images. These were added later by Roger II's successors, William I and William II. The nave's ceiling consists of Arab, Greek and Latin inscriptions.

The frame for the royal throne sets against the west wall of the nave. There are six steps leading up to where the throne would be, along with two heraldic lions in two roundels upon the spandrels over the throne frame gable.

Part of the nave of the Cappella Palatina

The nave had different forms of decoration from the north and south to the east and west. Intricate lacing from the ceiling mold outline the arches of the nave in the north and South. These outlines are accompanied by oval medallions and cartouches. In the East and West, the decoration is similar to the muqarnas ceiling but is missing some molding for the borders of the ceiling.

== Sanctuary ==
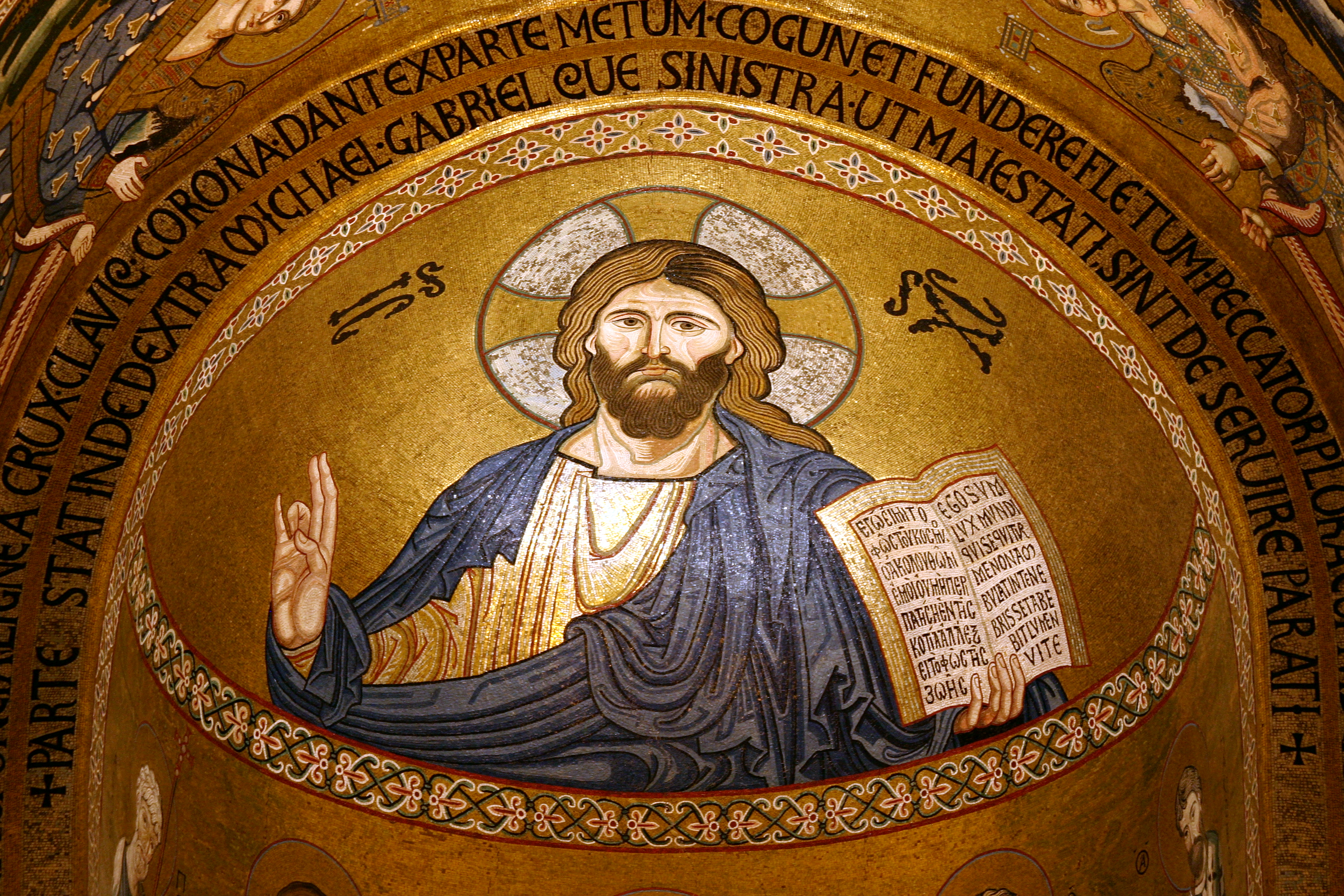
Mosaic of Christ Pantocrator

As an expression of Norman culture, St. Dionysius and St. Martin are represented in the sanctuary. Mosaics are of Byzantine culture in their composition and subjects. The apex of the dome consists of the Pantokrator, with rows of angels, prophets, evangelists and saints. The Byzantine motif ends abruptly with scenes from Christ's life along the south wall of the southern transept arm, while the north wall consists of warrior saints.

== Analysis ==
Slobodan Ćurčić considers the Palatine Cappella a reflection of Middle Byzantine art. Illustrating architectural and artistic genius to juxtapose Sicily's "melting pot" culture.

According to European historians, Roger II made the decision to make the throne room and chapel equal in the main part of the Cappella Palatina in order to send a message to the papacy and other rulers of Europe that he was going to stay in Sicily, and there was nothing they could do about it.

== Notable people ==
- Giuseppe Bertini (1759–1852), maestro di cappella at the Cappella Palatina from 1794 through 1852; previously deputy maestro di capella under his father, Salvatore Bertini.

== See also ==
- Arab-Norman Palermo and the Cathedral Churches of Cefalù and Monreale
- High medieval domes
