= Oreto =

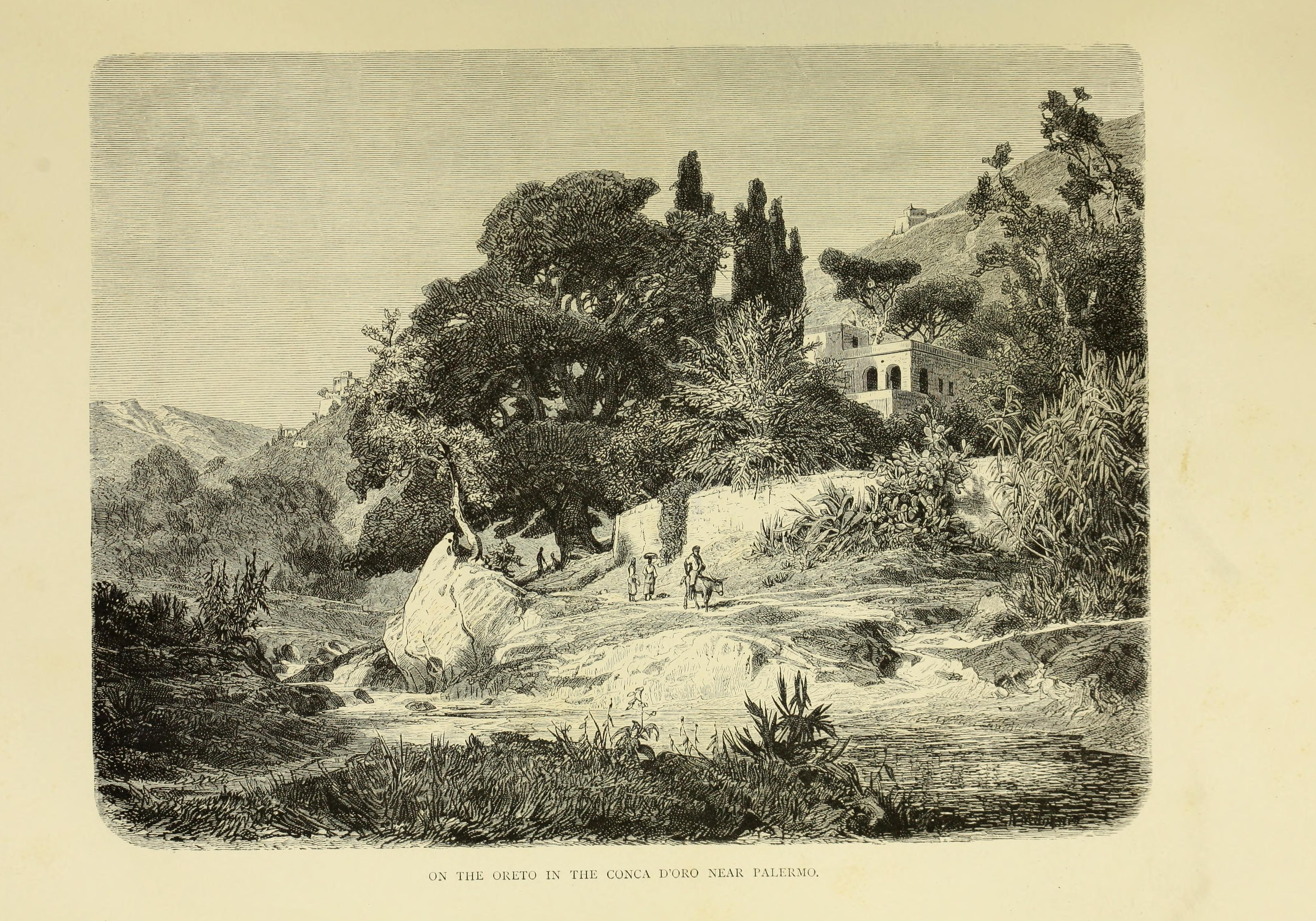
- Illustration of the Oreto River and Valley (1877)

Location
- Country: Italy

Physical characteristics
- Source
  - location: Altofonte-Monreale
  - elevation: about 1,050 m (3,440 ft)
- Mouth: Tyrrhenian Sea
  - coordinates: 38.1106°N 13.3808°E
- Length: 22 km (14 mi)
- Basin size: 129 km^{2} (50 sq mi)

The Oreto is a 22-kilometre (14 mi) river in Sicily. Its source is located between Altofonte and Monreale, a few kilometers from Palermo. It gives its name to the Oreto Valley and crosses the south-east portion of the city before flowing into the Tyrrhenian Sea.

Called "Wādī al-ʿAbbās" during the Islamic period, the river has had an important role in the history of Palermo. In the 12th century, in order to cross it, the Ammiratus ammiratorum George of Antioch built the Admiral's Bridge.
