= Giuseppe Bertini (composer) =

- Born: January 20, 1759; Palermo
- Died: March 15, 1852 (aged 93); Palermo
- Education: Scuole Pie degli Scolopi
- Occupations: Composer, choral conductor, lexographer, scholar, Roman Catholic priest

Giuseppe Bertini (January 20, 1759 – March 15, 1852) was an Italian composer, choral conductor, lexicographer, scholar, and Roman Catholic priest.

== Life and career ==
The son of composer Salvatore Bertini, Giuseppe Bertini was born in Palermo, Italy on January 20, 1759. His father was the maestro di cappella at the Cappella Palatina and he likely received his early music instruction from him. He was educated at the Piarist institution Scuole Pie degli Scolopi, and was ordained as a priest in the Roman Catholic church. He became a musician and a scholar of Sicilian archaeology, literature, and cultural history. He began his career as deputy maestro di cappella at the Cappella Palatina under his father, and succeeded him in that post when Salvatore died in 1794. He remained maestro di capella of that church until his death in Palermo on March 15, 1852.

Giuseppe's brother, Natale Bertini, was also a composer. The brothers both created music compositions for a memorial service given in early 1789, in honor of Charles III, who died in December 1788. In December 1827, Natale Bertini was appointed president of a commissione di censura for sacred music; an official censorship body of the Roman Catholic church whose role was to eliminate music from the church deemed to be too "theatrical". Giuseppe succeeded his brother Natale as president of this organization in May 1828 and remained in that role for two years.

As a composer, Giuseppe Bertini wrote a large amount of sacred music including masses and works for vespers, but none of it survives. He wrote a music dictionary, Dizionario storico-critico degli scrittori di musica, which was published in Palermo in 1814–1815.
