= Arab-Norman Palermo and the Cathedral Churches of Cefalù and Monreale =

World Heritage Sites in Italy for its unique architecture

UNESCO World Heritage Site
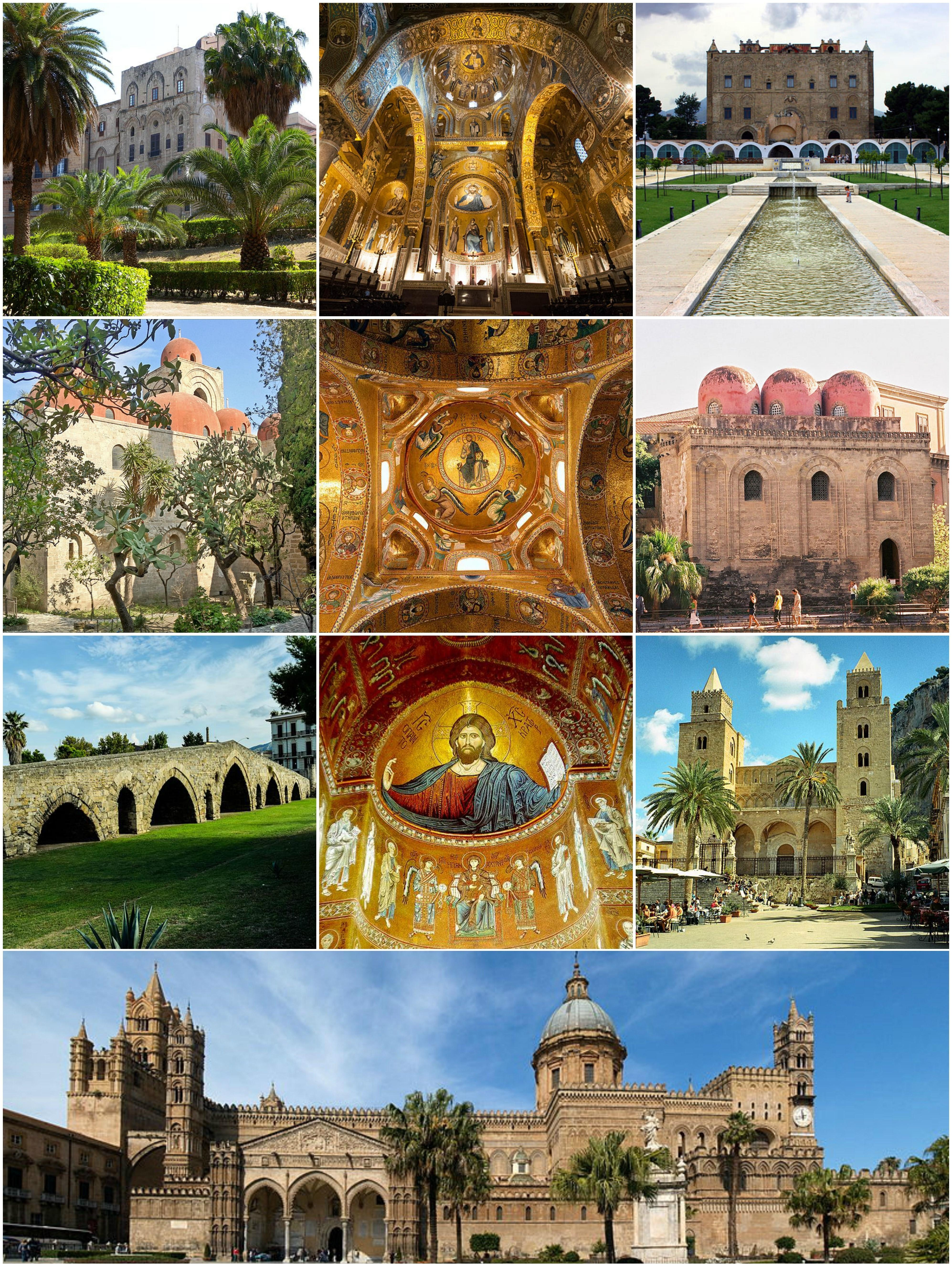

- Location within Italy
- Location: Sicily, Italy
- Includes: Cefalù Cathedral, Cattedrale di Monreale
- Criteria: Cultural: (ii), (iv)
- Reference: 1487
- Inscription: 2015 (39th Session)
- Area: 6.235 ha (0.02407 sq mi)
- Buffer zone: 483.008 ha (1.86490 sq mi)
- Coordinates: 38°6′39″N 13°21′11″E

The Arab-Norman Palermo and the Cathedral Churches of Cefalù and Monreale are a series of nine religious and civic structures located on the northern coast of Sicily dating from the era of the Norman Kingdom of Sicily (1130-1194): two palaces, three churches, a cathedral, and a bridge in Palermo, as well as the cathedrals of Cefalù and Monreale. They have been designated together as a UNESCO World Heritage Site. This dedication took place in 2015.

The new Norman rulers built various structures in what has become known as the Arab-Norman style. They incorporated the best practices of Arab and Byzantine architecture into their own art. Although a different builder constructed each of the sites, they are linked together because of their shared architecture and time period.

On the Friday after these locations gained World Heritage Sites tatus, Italy celebrated with a ceremony. As Palermo Mayor Leoluca Orlando and then Italian president Sergio Mattarella revealed a plaque, various Italian officials and public figures attended at the entrance of the Palazzo dei Normanni which hosts the Sicilian Regional Assembly. He said that "we send this message of coexistence." The president highlighted the contributions of the Arabs and Normans to Italian history. Currently all of the buildings are under continuous restoration and care. This care varies from site to site but most often consists of topical restoration (cleaning, maintaining murals, etc), research (what the building might have looked like originally and what was done there), and structural restoration (making sure the building is safe and structurally sound).

== Structures ==
Building	City	Photo
Royal Palace or Palace of the Normans	Palermo	
Palatine Chapel of the Royal Palace	Palermo	
La Zisa	Palermo	
Cathedral of the Assumption of Virgin Mary	Palermo	
Church of Saint John of the Hermits	Palermo	
Church of the Martorana	Palermo	
Church of Saint Cataldo	Palermo	
Admiral's Bridge	Palermo	
Duomo	Cefalù	
Duomo	Monreale	
