= Ponte dell'Ammiraglio =

Admiral's Bridge Ponte dell'Ammiraglio
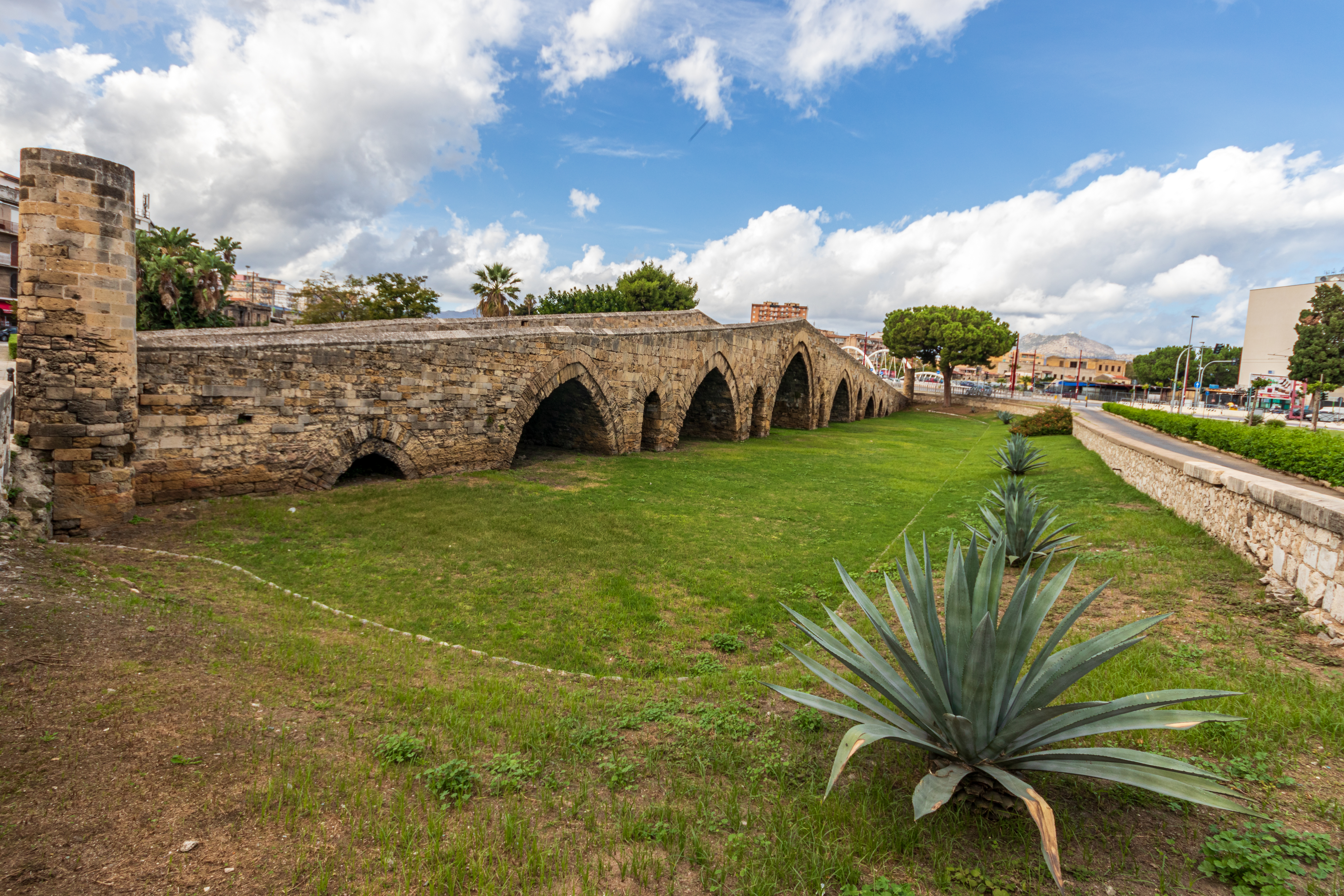
- Coordinates: 38°06′18″N 13°22′30″E
- Crosses: Oreto River (until 1938)

Characteristics
- Material: Stone

History
- Construction end: 1131

UNESCO World Heritage Site
- Official name: Arab-Norman Palermo and the Cathedral Churches of Cefalù and Monreale
- Type: Cultural
- Criteria: ii, iv
- Designated: 2015 (39th session)
- Reference no.: 1487
- Region: Europe and North America

The Admiral's Bridge (Italian: Ponte dell'Ammiraglio) is a medieval bridge of Palermo, located in Piazza Scaffa. It was built over the Oreto River during the era of the Norman Sicily by the ammiratus ammiratorum George of Antioch. In 2015, it became a UNESCO World Heritage Site as part of a series of nine civil and religious structures inscribed as Arab-Norman Palermo and the Cathedral Churches of Cefalù and Monreale.

== History ==
According to a legend, the bridge is situated in the place where the Archangel Michael appeared to the Norman Count Roger I of Sicily helping him to conquer Palermo, at that time an Islamic bastion. It was completed in 1131, a year after the incoronation of Roger II as first King of Sicily. The construction was supervised by the admiral George of Antioch, the most powerful man of the Kingdom after Roger II. The bridge had the function to connect the capital to the royal gardens located across the Oreto River, like the Favara Park. Even now, the structure represents a symbol connecting the historic centre to the peripheral quarter of Brancaccio.

In the Middle Ages the Oreto Valley was rich in flora, especially date palm. A great "dattileto" stood near the bridge, but it was destroyed in 1314 – during the long-lasting war between the dynasties of Anjou and Barcelona - by the Count of Marzano, ally of Robert of Anjou, King of Naples.

In the following centuries, besides the agriculture, the Oreto Valley became a place of manufacturing for sugar cane, paper and other production activities. The profitable production of sugar led to the creation of vast plantations of sugar cane and also to a massive deforestation in certain zones of the Conca d'Oro. This problem represented the first reason for the series of floods that hit the city during the last few centuries.

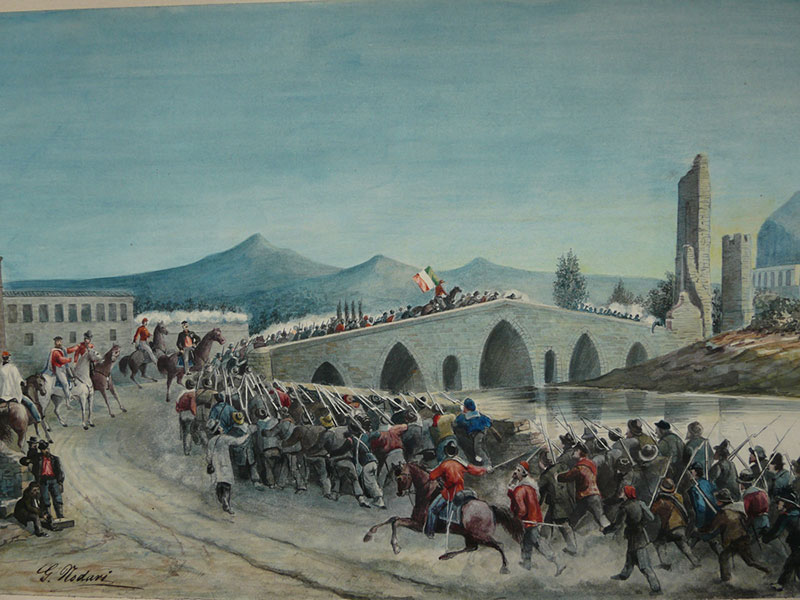
Giuseppe Nodari, The thousand cross the "Admiral's Bridge" in Palermo

Since then, the bridge has been repeatedly damaged by flooding of the river. For this reason, as long ago as 1775, an attempt was made to divert the river. However, it was not until 1938 that the Oreto was definitely diverted and canalized. Seven years before, in February 1931, Palermo had been plagued by a terrible flood.

Thanks to its strategic position, on 27 May 1860, the bridge was the place of a famous battle between the Red Shirts of Giuseppe Garibaldi and the army of the House of Bourbon-Two Sicilies during the Expedition of the Thousand.

In 2015, it became a UNESCO World Heritage Site as part of a series of nine civil and religious structures inscribed as Arab-Norman Palermo and the Cathedral Churches of Cefalù and Monreale.

== See also ==
- Arab-Norman Palermo and the Cathedral Churches of Cefalù and Monreale
