= Cefalù Cathedral =

Cathedral in Sicily

Cathedral-Basilica of Cefalù Duomo di Cefalù
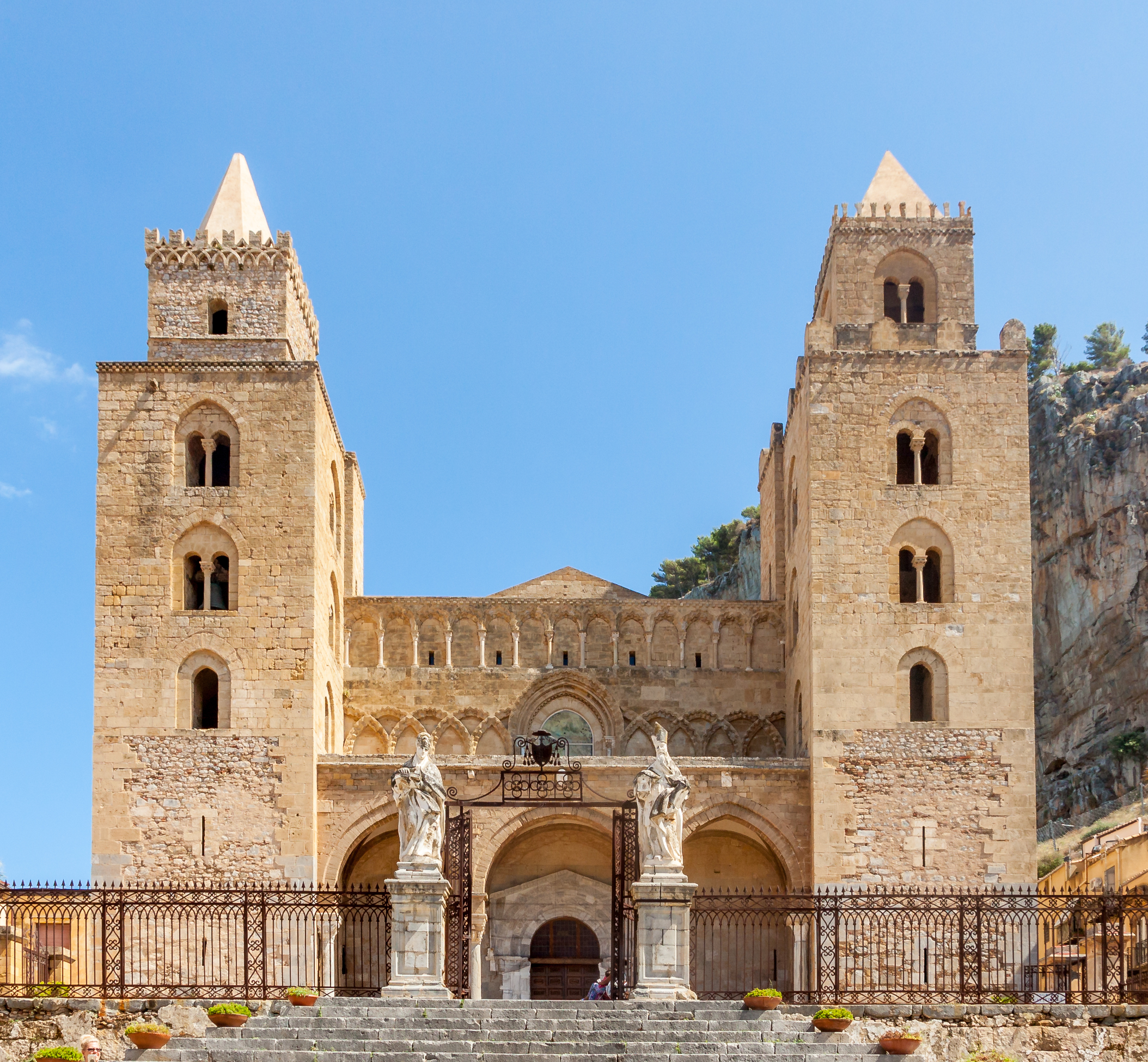
- The façade of the cathedral

Religion
- Affiliation: Roman Catholic Church
- Province: Diocese of Cefalù
- Ecclesiastical or organisational status: Cathedral
- Year consecrated: 1267
- Status: Active

Location
- Location: Cefalù, Italy
- Interactive map of Cathedral-Basilica of Cefalù; Duomo di Cefalù
- Coordinates: 38°02′23″N 14°01′26″E

Architecture
- Type: Church
- Style: Norman-Arab-Byzantine
- Groundbreaking: 1131
- Completed: 1240
- UNESCO World Heritage Site
- Official name: Arab-Norman Palermo and the Cathedral Churches of Cefalù and Monreale
- Type: Cultural
- Criteria: ii, iv
- Designated: 2015 (39th session)
- Reference no.: 1487-008
- State Party: Italy
- Region: Europe and North America

The Cathedral of Cefalù (Italian: Duomo di Cefalù) is a Roman Catholic basilica in Cefalù, Sicily. It is one of nine structures included in the UNESCO World Heritage Site known as Arab-Norman Palermo and the Cathedral Churches of Cefalù and Monreale.

The cathedral was erected between 1131 and 1240 in the Norman architectural style, the island of Sicily having been conquered by the Normans in 1091. According to tradition, the building was erected after a vow made to the Holy Saviour by the King of Sicily, Roger II, after he escaped from a storm to land on the city's beach. The building has a fortress-like character and, seen from a distance, it dominates the skyline of the surrounding medieval town. It made a powerful statement of the Norman presence.

Centuries later, the cathedral was a source of inspiration for architect Antonio Vandone's Mogadishu Cathedral, built between 1925 and 1928 in Italian Somaliland.

== History ==
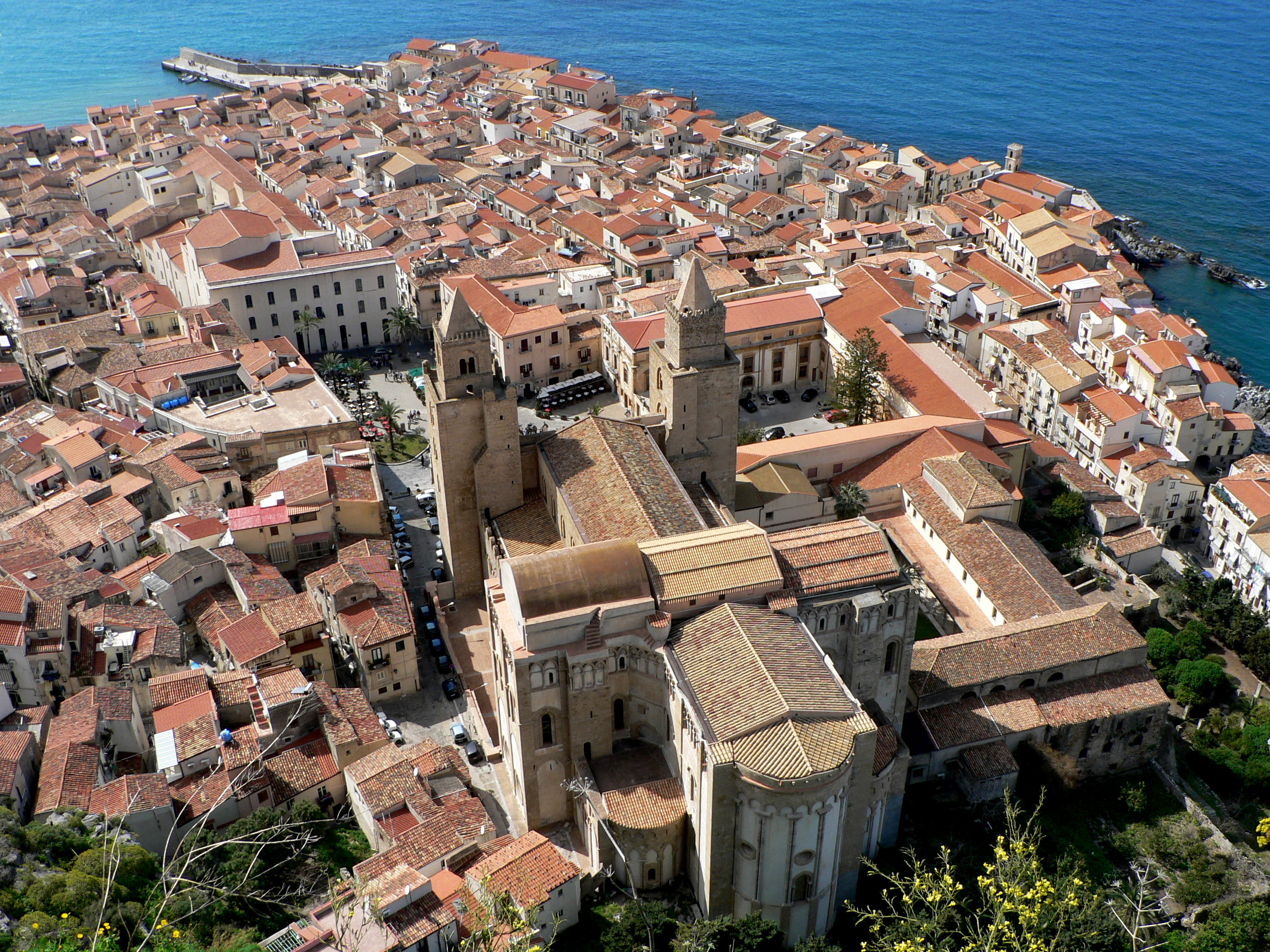
Cefalù Cathedral within the town

The cathedral was built in a long-populated area, as attested by the presence of a Roman road and a Paleo-Christian mosaic. Construction began in 1131, the apse mosaics were begun in 1145, and the sarcophagi that Roger II provided for his tomb and that of his wife were put in place the same year. After 1172 the church suffered a period of decline. In 1215 Frederick II of Hohenstaufen moved the two sarcophagi to the Cathedral of Palermo. Construction of the cathedral was resumed soon after, the façade being completed in 1240. The cathedral was consecrated in 1267 by Rodolphe de Chevrières, Bishop of Albano.

In 1472 a portico, by Ambrogio da Como, was added between the two towers of the facade.

== Description ==
=== Architecture ===
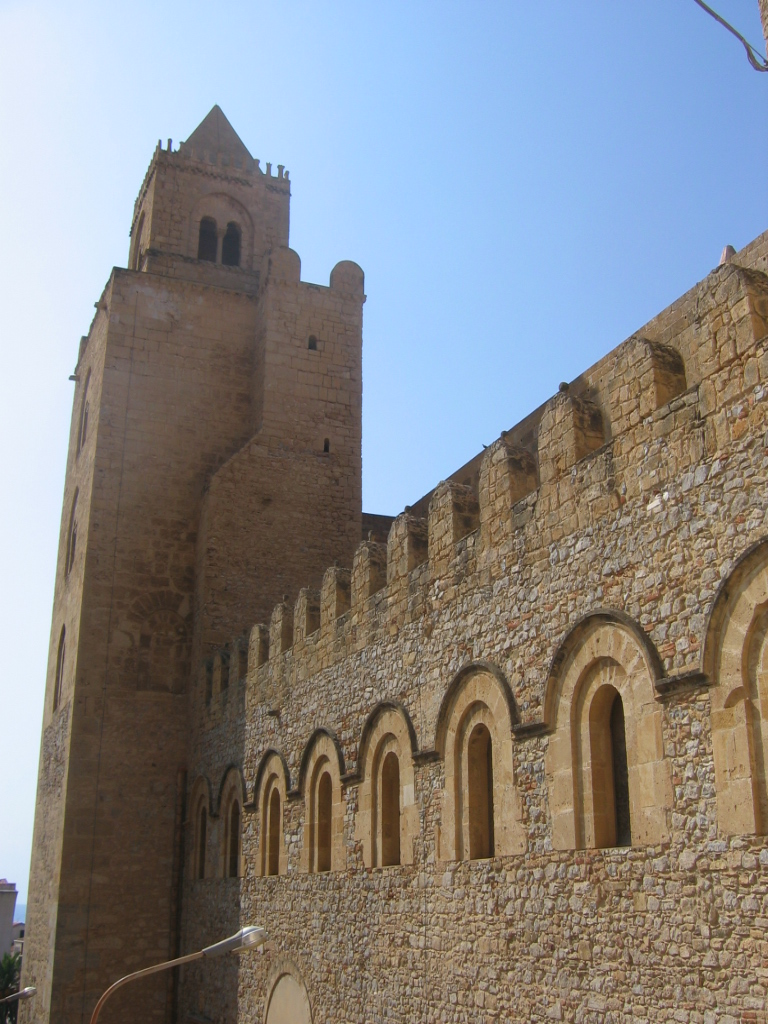
Lateral view

The cathedral is preceded by a large terraced parvis, which was originally a cemetery. According to tradition, it was created with earth brought from Jerusalem, which was believed to have qualities that caused the rapid mummification of corpses.

The façade is characterized by two large Norman towers with mullioned windows, each surmounted by a small spire added in the 15th century. Each spire is different: one has a square plan surrounded by flame-shaped merlons, the latter symbolizing the Papal authority and the mitre; the other has an octagonal plan and Ghibelline merlons, symbolizing the royal and temporal power.

The 15th-century portico has three arches, the two outer being pointed, supported by four columns and vaulting ribs. Under the portico is the Porta Regum (Kings' Door), with a finely decorated marble portal flanked by wall paintings.

The interior of the cathedral is on the Latin cross plan, divided into a nave and two aisles by arcades of antique columns: fourteen in pink granite and two in cipolin. The bases and capitals are from the 2nd century AD. Two large capitals supporting the triumphal arch of the nave were probably made by a Sicilian workshop in the mid-12th century.

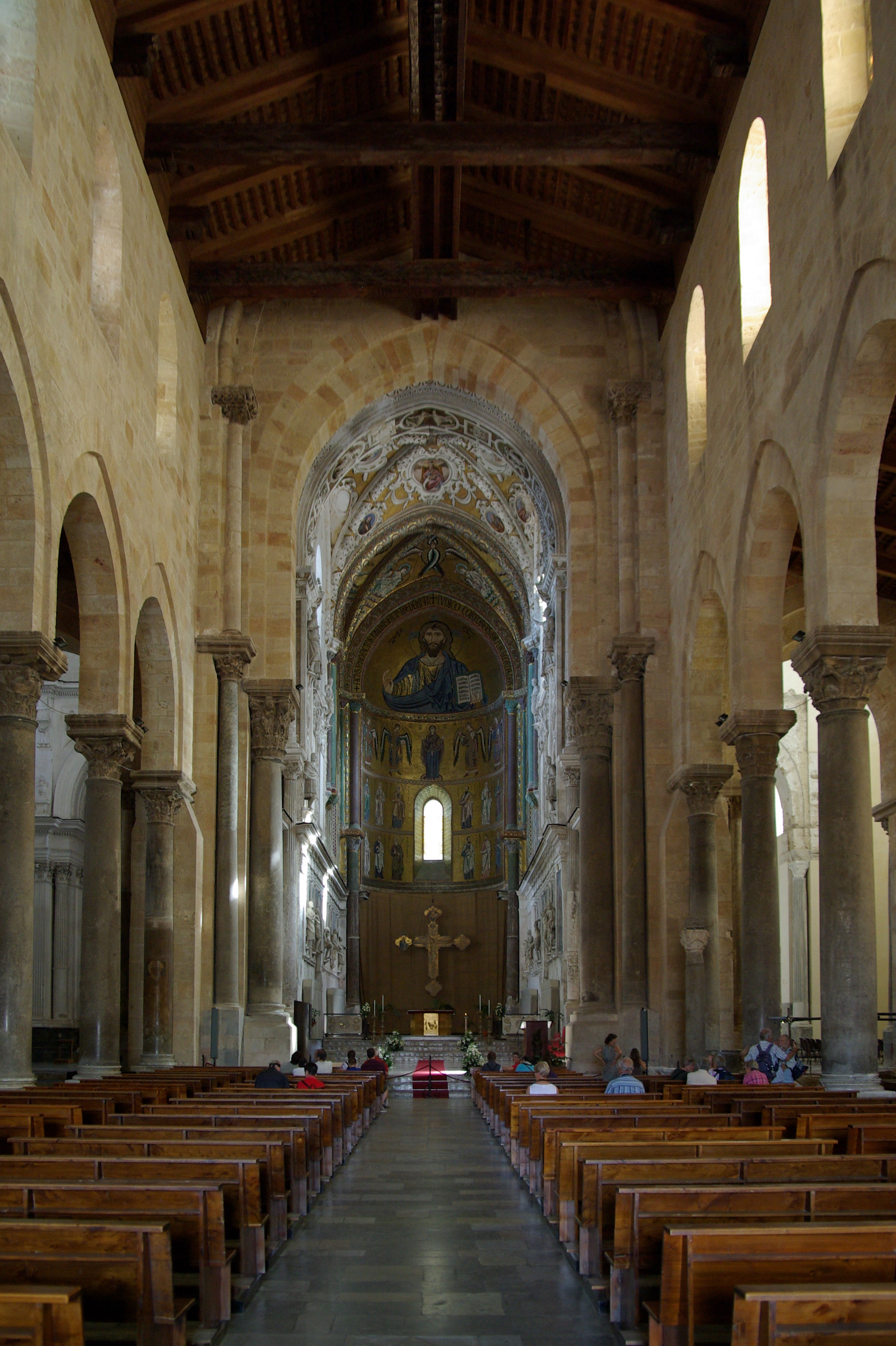
Interior view towards the chancel

The roof of the nave was lowered, as can be seen from the exterior of the building. The transept is higher than both the nave and aisles. While parts of the building are barrel-vaulted and parts have an open timber roof, the presbytery has a ribbed vault of stone.

Beyond the crossing, the church is unusual in combining a style that is essentially Romanesque in its massive simple forms with the Gothic pointed arch. This feature is also seen in Monreale Cathedral. It is a forerunner of the Gothic style which was to develop in the region of Paris within a few years.

The church has three apses, an arrangement also seen in Sicily at Monreale Cathedral. The two lower side apses have the upper tiers of the exterior decorated by blind arcading of small crossed arches and sculpted corbels, also seen used extensively at Monreale. The corbels date from 1215 to 1223 and portray masks, heads of animals, and human figures in contorted positions. The corbels of the central apse are more recent. The central apse originally had three large ocular windows, which were later closed to give space for the mosaic, and a larger central window of ogival shape. Two other pairs of circular windows are located at the transept's ends.

==== Cloister ====
The cathedral has a cloister that can be entered from within the church. The arcade has pointed arches, each of which rests on slender, paired columns. The form is not different from that of Spanish and some French cloisters; the composite capitals of the coupled columns are Norman and other more generically Romanesque in their motifs. This cloister is the model for the successive Norman cloisters of Sicily, in particular that of the Monreale.

=== Artwork ===
==== Presbyterium mosaic ====
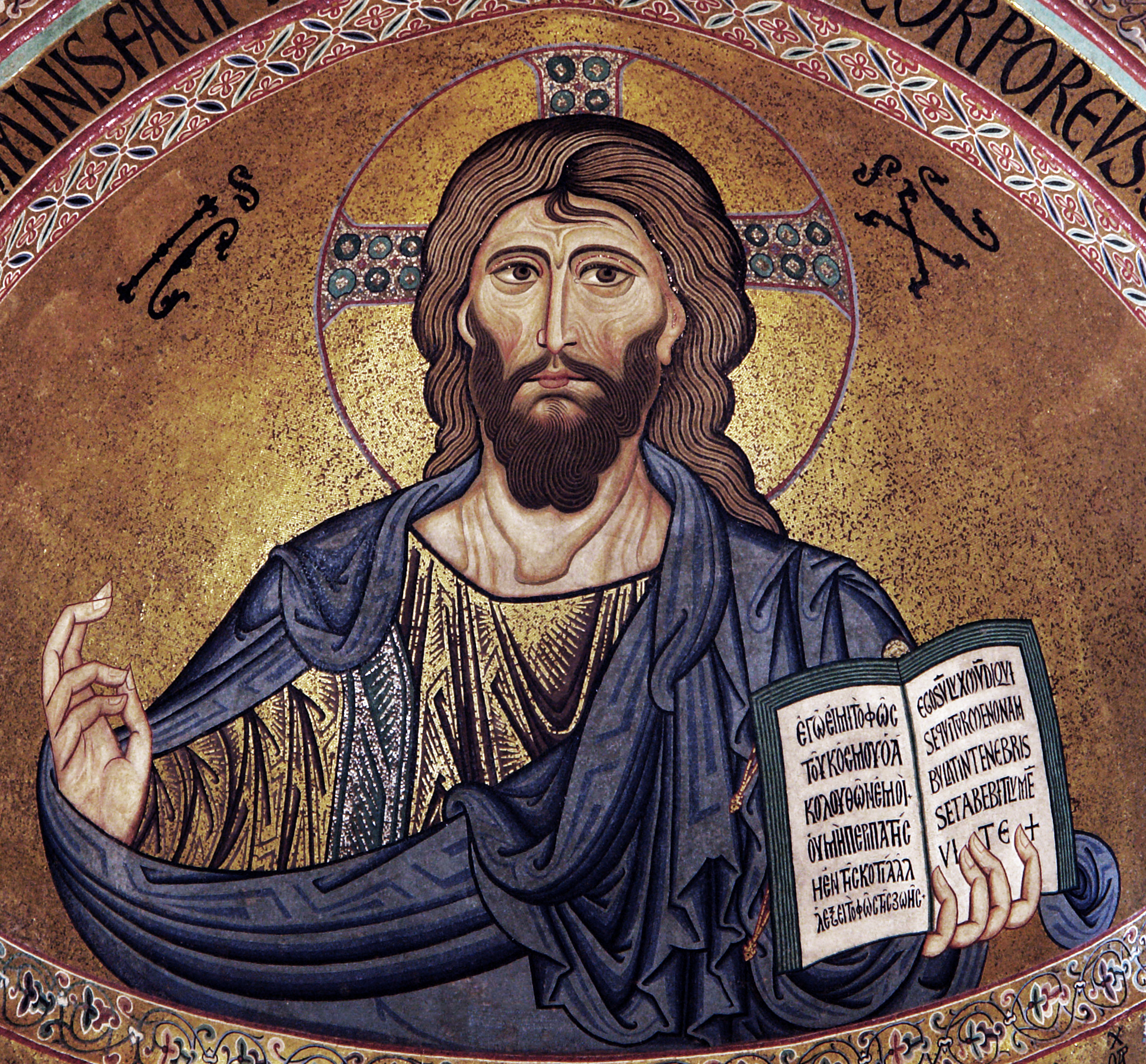
Christ Pantokrator.

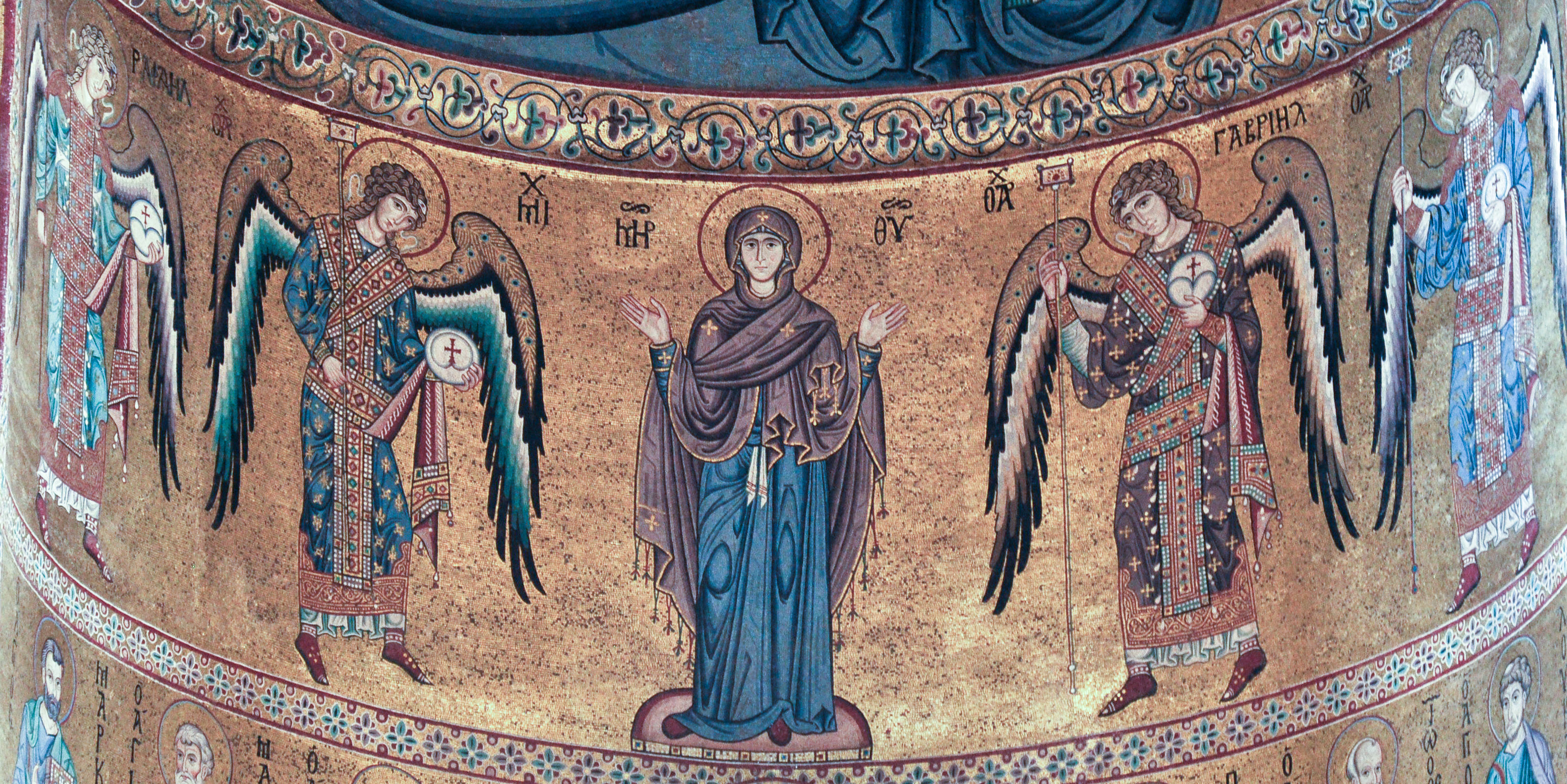
Virgin Mary with four archangels.

It was probably planned that the entire church be decorated in mosaic, but this was completed only in the presbyterium area. Mosaic still covers the apse and about half of the side walls. Roger II brought masters in the technique of mosaic from Constantinople. They adapted their traditional Byzantine decorative art to an architectural structure that was of northern European origin.

The dominant figure of the decorative scheme is the bust of Christ Pantokrator, portrayed on the semi-dome of the apse with a hand raised in Benediction. In his left hand he carries the Gospel of John, in which can be read, in Greek and Latin: "I am the light of the world, who follows me will not wander in the darkness but will have the light of life" (John, 8:12).

In the upper tier of the apsidal wall is depicted the Blessed Virgin Mary, her hands raised in obsecration, flanked by four archangels. In the second and third tiers, on either side of the central window, are figures of apostles and evangelists, placed according to a planned theological programme.

The mosaic decoration extends into the presbyterium, with the side walls showing figures of prophets and saints. On the right wall, adjacent to the royal throne, are royal figures, while on the left side, adjacent the bishop's throne, are priestly figures. Each figure is accompanied by an inscription, in Greek or Latin, describing the character portrayed. The decoration of the cross-vaulted ceiling depicts four cherubim and four seraphim.

The chief figures, that of Christ Pantokrator and the Virgin Mary, are clothed in blue, given luminosity by a background of gold tiles. The work is of the highest order, displaying elegance in the draping of the figures' robes and in the sensitivity of their faces and gestures. It is considered the finest Byzantine mosaic in Italy and comparable to other fine Late Byzantine work from Constantinople.

The Byzantine mosaic decoration was completed before 1170. The lower part and the side walls of the presbyterium were not completed until the 17th century. They covered preceding paintings of which scarce traces remain today.

==== Other artwork ====
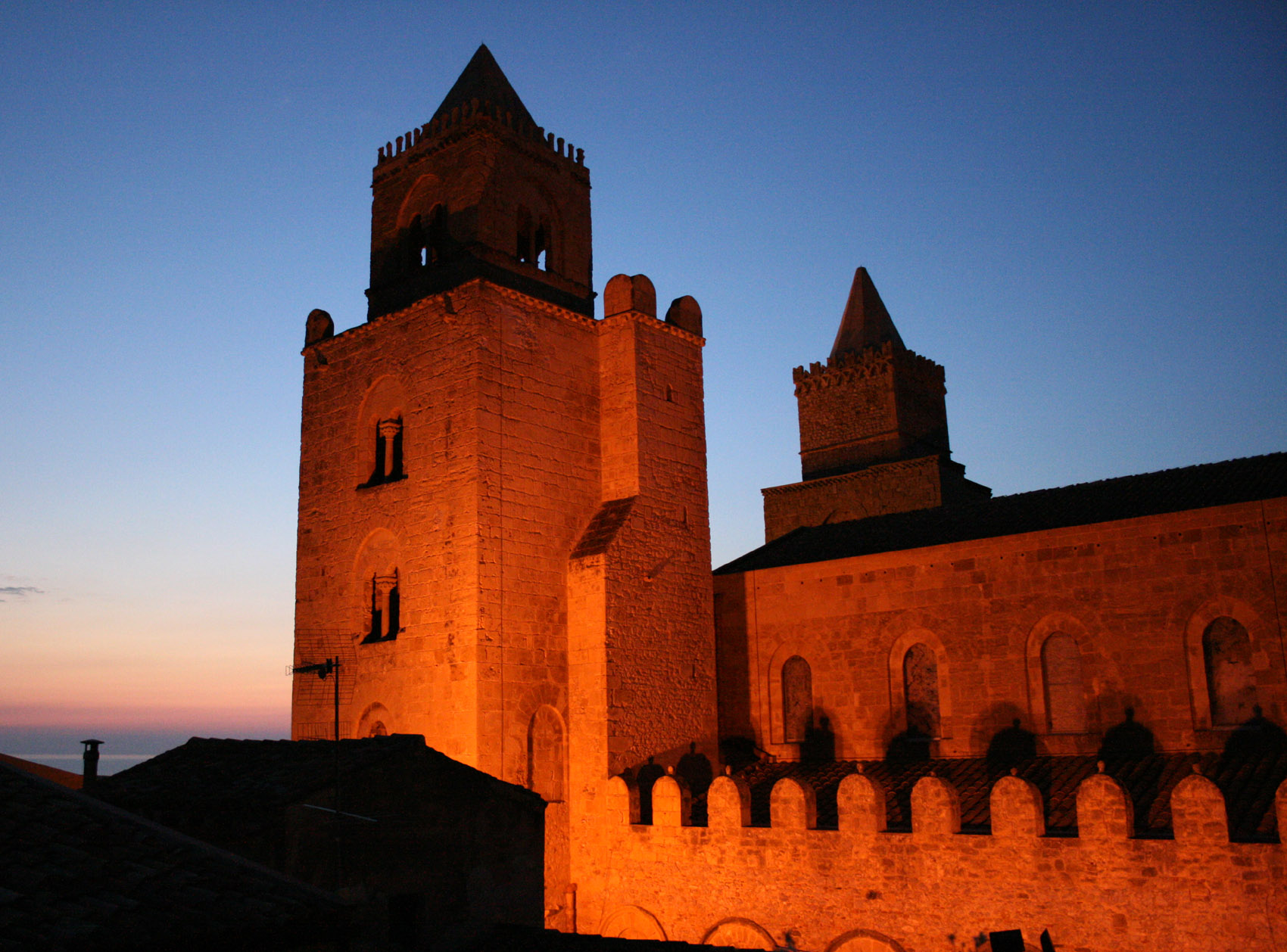
The cathedral at night

Of the original painted decoration, a figure of Urban V from the late 14th century, on a column on the left aisle; and a "Madonna enthroned" from the 15th century, in the left arm of the transept, remain.

The basilica houses several funerary monuments, including a late Antique sarcophagus, a medieval one, and the notable sepulchre of the Bishop Castelli of the 18th century.

The 12th-century baptismal font, carved from a single block of stone, is decorated with four small sculpted lions. The church also houses a canvas of the Madonna from Antonello Gagini's workshop (16th century) and a painted wooden cross by Guglielmo da Pesaro (1468). The organ is a large two-manual instrument with detached console and plain pipework, sitting above a panelled wooden case.

The nave's ceiling has a painted decoration with busts, fanciful animals and other motifs, probably the work of Arabic craftsmen.

Starting in 1985, the Palermo artist Michele Canzoneri was commissioned and has installed 72 modern, abstract, stained-glass windows based on episodes from the Old and New Testaments. These have aroused some controversy for their style.

==== Palæo-Christian mosaic ====
Excavations in the cathedral area have brought to light parts of a 6th-century polychrome mosaic. They depict a dove drinking, parts of two other birds, two small trees, and a lily-shaped flower, enclosed in a frame with ogival and lozenge motifs.

This mosaic belonged probably to a pre-existing Byzantine basilica. This area of Cefalù was frequented at least up to the 8th century, when it was an episcopal see.

== See also ==
- Cathedral of Monreale
- Palazzo dei Normanni
- Arab-Norman Palermo and the Cathedral Churches of Cefalù and Monreale
- Mogadishu Cathedral
