= Monreale Cathedral =

Cathedral in Monreale, Palermo, Sicily, southern Italy

- Duomo di Monreale (Italian); Domu di Murriali (Sicilian)
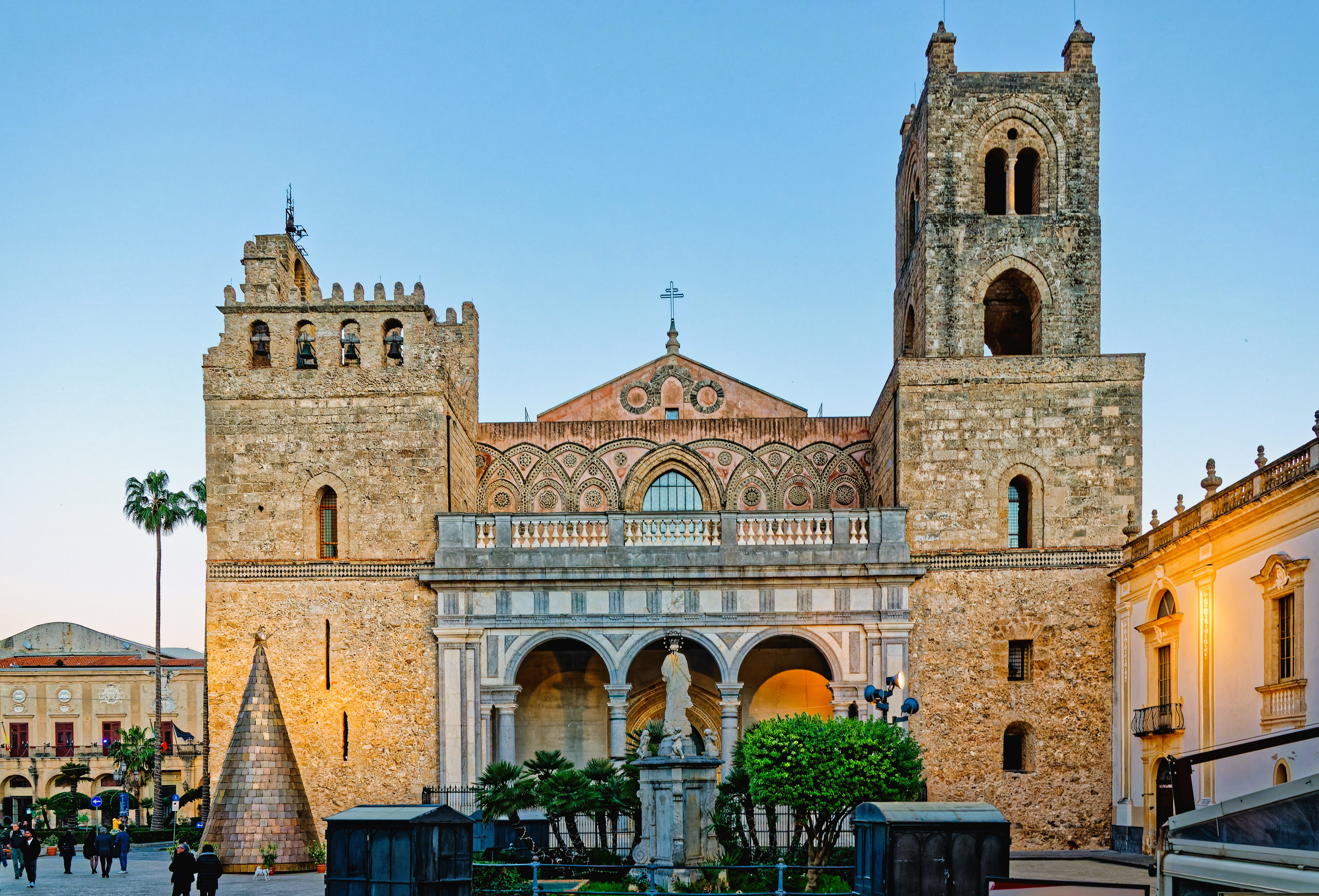
- Façade of the cathedral

Religion
- Affiliation: Catholic
- Province: Archdiocese of Monreale
- Rite: Roman

Location
- Location: Monreale, Sicily, Italy
- Interactive map of Monreale Cathedral
- Coordinates: 38°04′54.69″N 13°17′31.44″E

Architecture
- Style: Norman, Gothic, Renaissance, Baroque
- Groundbreaking: 1172
- Completed: 1267
- UNESCO World Heritage Site
- Official name: Arab-Norman Palermo and the cathedral churches of Cefalù and Monreale
- Type: Architectural
- Criteria: ii, iv
- Designated: 2015 (39th session)
- Reference no.: 1487
- State Party: Italy
- Region: Europe and North America

Santa Maria Nuova Cathedral (Italian: Cattedrale di Santa Maria Nuova), usually known as Monreale Cathedral (Italian: Duomo di Monreale; Sicilian: Domu di Murriali), is a Catholic church in Monreale, a municipality in the Metropolitan City of Palermo, Sicily, Italy. One of the greatest extant examples of Norman architecture, it was begun in 1174 by William II of Sicily and is dedicated to the Nativity of the Virgin Mary. The church was elevated by a bull of Pope Lucius III to the rank of a metropolitan cathedral in 1182 as the seat of the Diocese of Monreale, which was elevated to the Archdiocese of Monreale in 1183. Since 2015 it has been part of the Arab-Norman Palermo and the Cathedral Churches of Cefalù and Monreale UNESCO World Heritage Site.

The church is a national monument of Italy and one of the most important attractions of Sicily. It is 102 meters (335 feet) long and 40 meters (131 feet) wide.

== History ==
According to a legend, William II of Sicily fell asleep under a carob tree while hunting in the woods near Monreale. The Holy Virgin appeared to him in his dreams and suggested that he build a church where he lay. While clearing the land, a treasure trove of gold coins was found in the roots of the carob tree, which were later used to finance the construction of the structure. It is more likely that the church was part of a plan of large constructions in competition with the then bishop of Palermo, Walter Ophamil, who had ordered the large Cathedral of Palermo. The construction of Monreale, started in 1172, was approved by Pope Alexander III with a bull on 30 December 1174. Works, including an annexed abbey, were completed only in 1267 and the church consecrated at the presence of Pope Clement IV. In 1178 Pope Lucius III established the archdiocese of Monreale and the abbey church was elevated to the rank of cathedral. The archbishops obtained by the kings of Sicily a wide array of privileges and lands in the whole Italian peninsula.

In 1270 the heart of Saint Louis IX, King of France, brother of King Charles I of Naples, was buried here.

In 1547-1569 a portico was added to the northern side, designed by Giovanni Domenico Gagini and Fazio Gagini, in Renaissance style, covered by a cross vault and featuring eleven round arches supported by Corinthian columns. In 1559 most of the internal pavement was added.

== Description ==
The archiepiscopal palace and monastic buildings on the south side were of great size and magnificence, and were surrounded by a massive precinct wall, crowned at intervals by twelve towers. This has been mostly rebuilt, and but little now remains except ruins of some of the towers, a great part of the monks' dormitory and frater, and the splendid cloister, completed about 1200.

The latter is well preserved, and is one of the finest European cloisters extant both for its size and the beauty of its detailing. It is about 2,200 m^{2}, with pointed arches decorated with diaper work, supported on pairs of columns in white marble, 216 in all, which are alternately plain and decorated with bands of patterns in gold and colors, made of glass tesserae, arranged either spirally or vertically along each shaft. The marble capitals are each carved with foliage, biblical scenes and allegories; no two are the same. At one corner, a square pillared projection contains the marble fountain or monks' lavatorium.

The plan of the church is based on models of Clunian origin from northern France. The facade is flanked by two towers, like Cefalù Cathedral, while the large three-apse choir is similar to one of the first three-apse churches.

The basilican nave is wide, with narrow aisles. On each side, columns of grey oriental granite (except one, which is of cipolin marble) support eight pointed arches much stilted. The capitals of these (mainly Corinthian) are also of the classical period. There is no triforium, but a high clerestory with wide two-light windows, with simple tracery like those in the nave-aisles and throughout the church, which give sufficient light.

The other half, eastern in two senses, is both wider and higher than the nave. It also is divided into a central space with two aisles, each of the divisions ending at the east with an apse. The roofs throughout are of open woodwork very low in pitch, constructionally plain, but richly decorated with colour, now mostly restored. At the west end of the nave are two projecting towers, with a narthex (entrance) between them. A large open atrium, which once existed at the west, is now completely destroyed, having been replaced by a Renaissance portico by Giovanni Domenico and Fazio Gagini (1547–1569).

The main internal features are the vast (6,500 m^{2}; 70,000 sq. ft.) glass mosaics, executed in Byzantine style between the late 12th and the mid-13th centuries by both local and Venetians masters. The tomb of William I of Sicily (the founder's father), a porphyry sarcophagus contemporary with the church, under a marble pillared canopy, and the founder William II's tomb, erected in 1575, were both shattered by a fire, which in 1811 broke out in the choir, injuring some of the mosaics and destroying all the fine walnut choir-fittings, the organs and most of the choir roof. The tombs were rebuilt, and the whole of the injured part of the church restored a few years after the fire. The present organ, revised in 1967 by Ruffatti, has six manuals and 102 stops.

On the north of the choir are the tombs of Margaret of Navarre, wife of William I, and her two sons Roger and Henry, together with an urn containing the viscera of Saint Louis of France, who died in 1270. The pavement of the triple choir, though much restored, is a specimen of marble and porphyry mosaic in opus alexandrinum, with signs of Arab influence in its main lines. The mosaic pavement of the nave was completed in the 16th century, and has disks of porphyry and granite with marble bands intermingled with irregular lines.

Two Baroque chapels were added in the 17th and 18th centuries, which are shut off from the rest of the church. The bronze doors of the mosaic-decorated portal on the left side was made by Barisano da Trani in 1179.

== Gallery ==
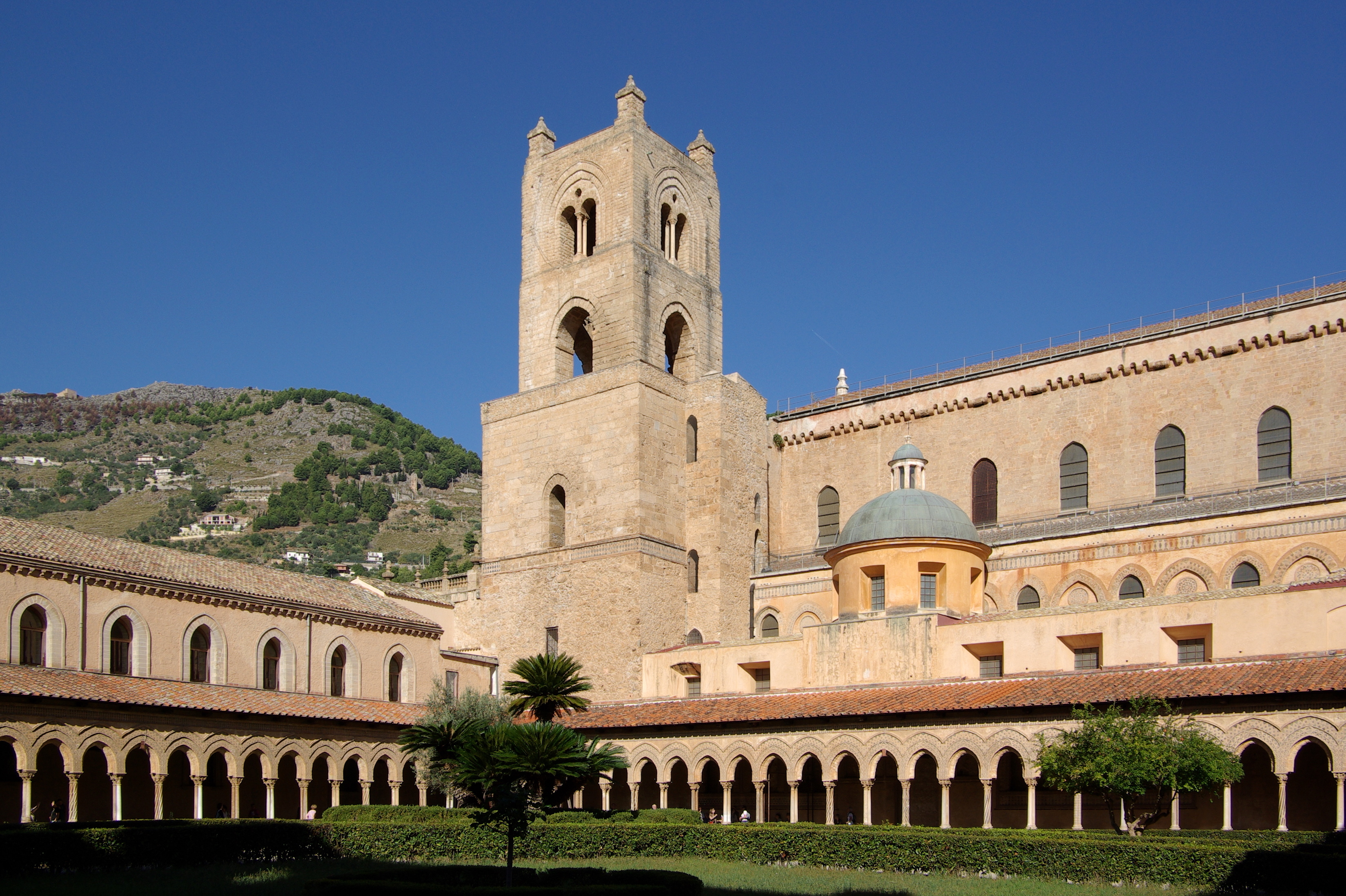
The cloister

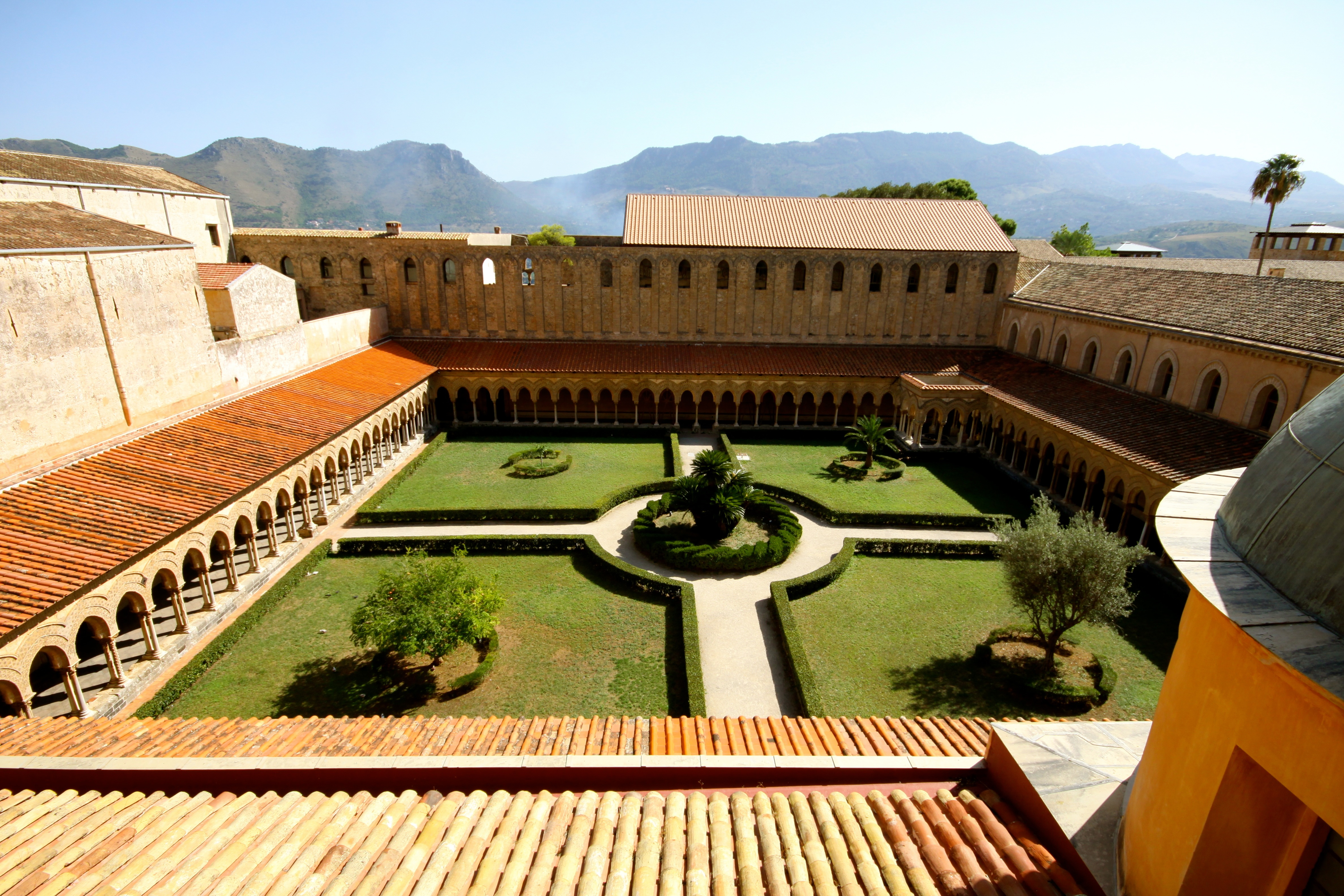
Cloister

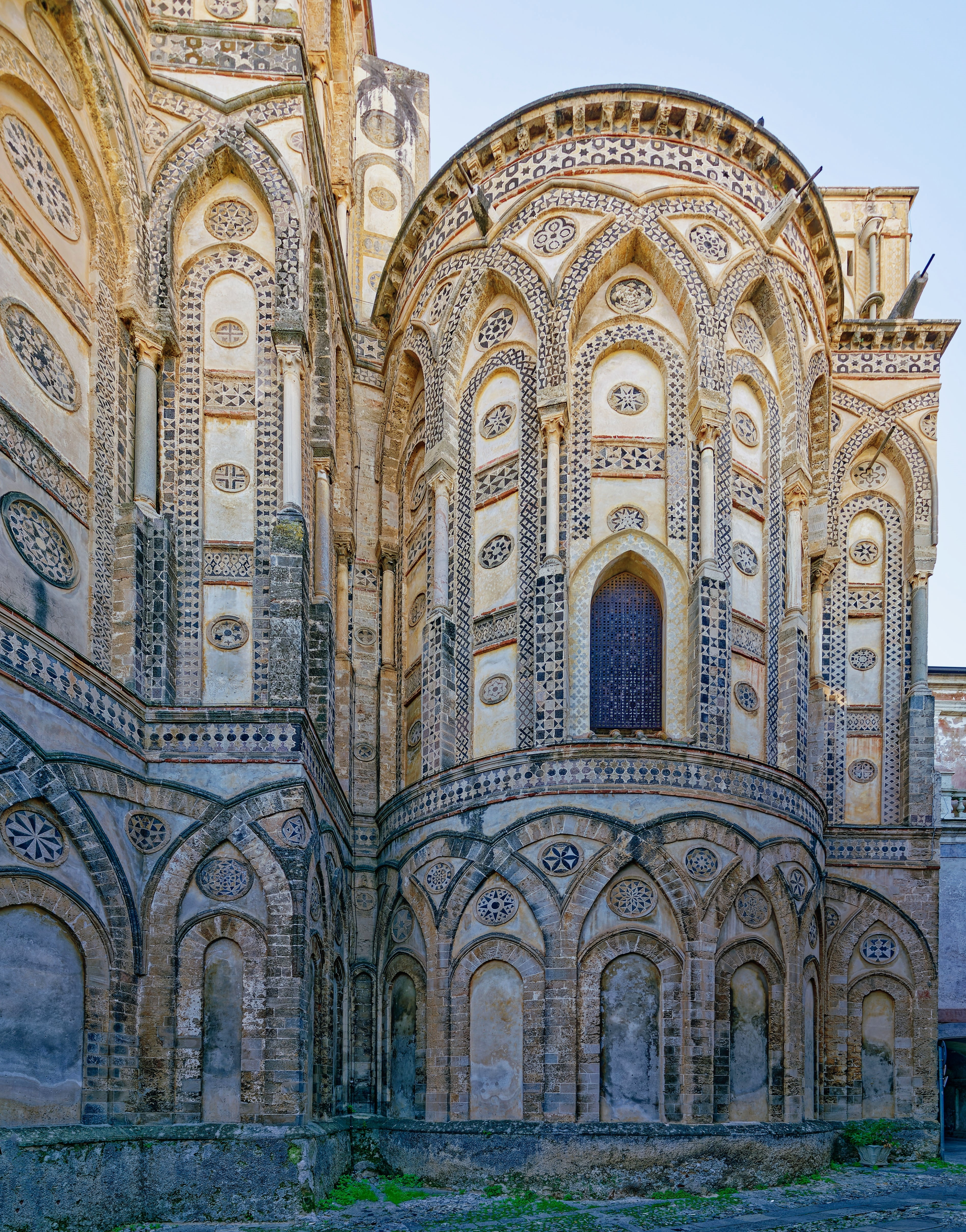
Apse

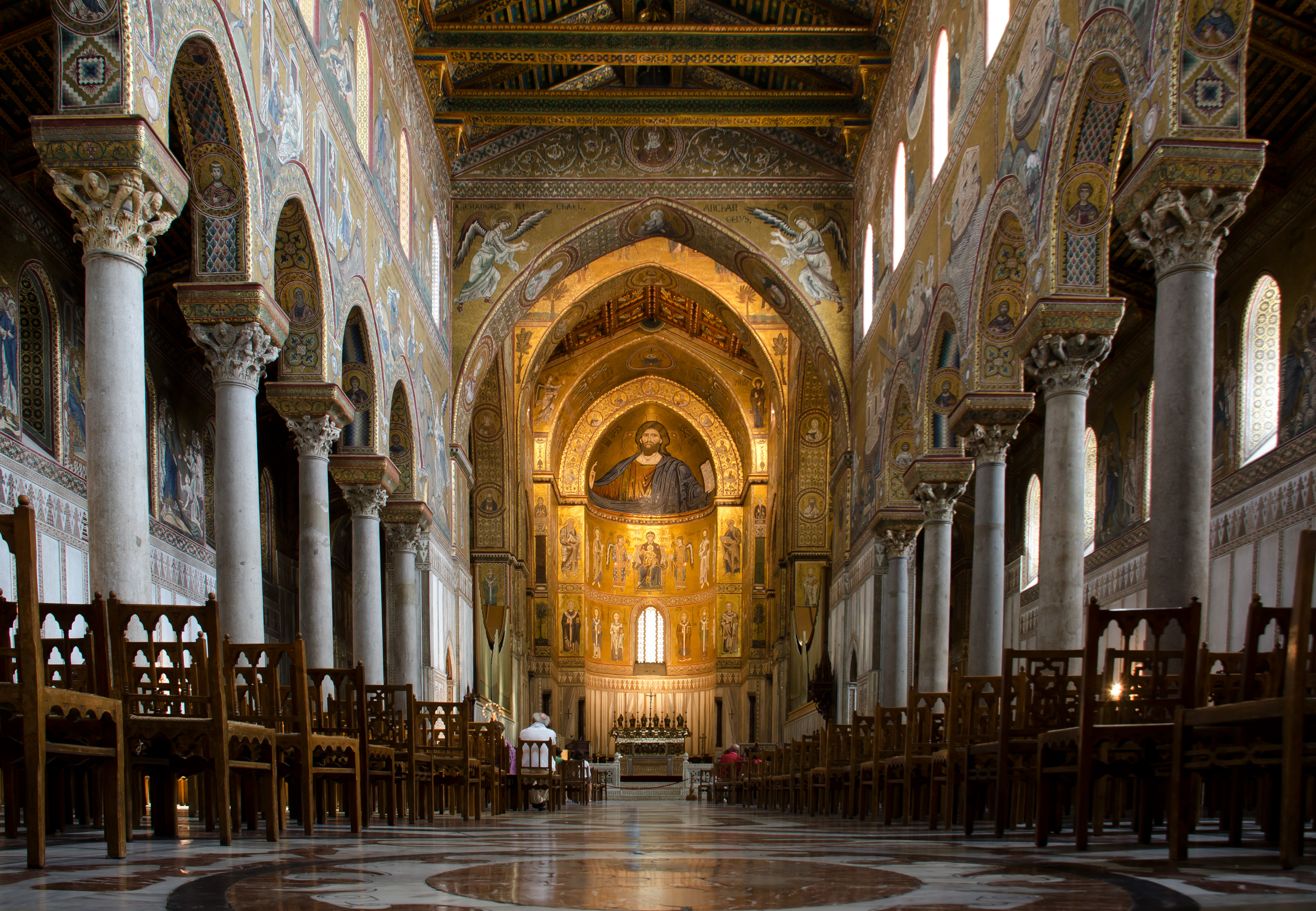
Apse interior

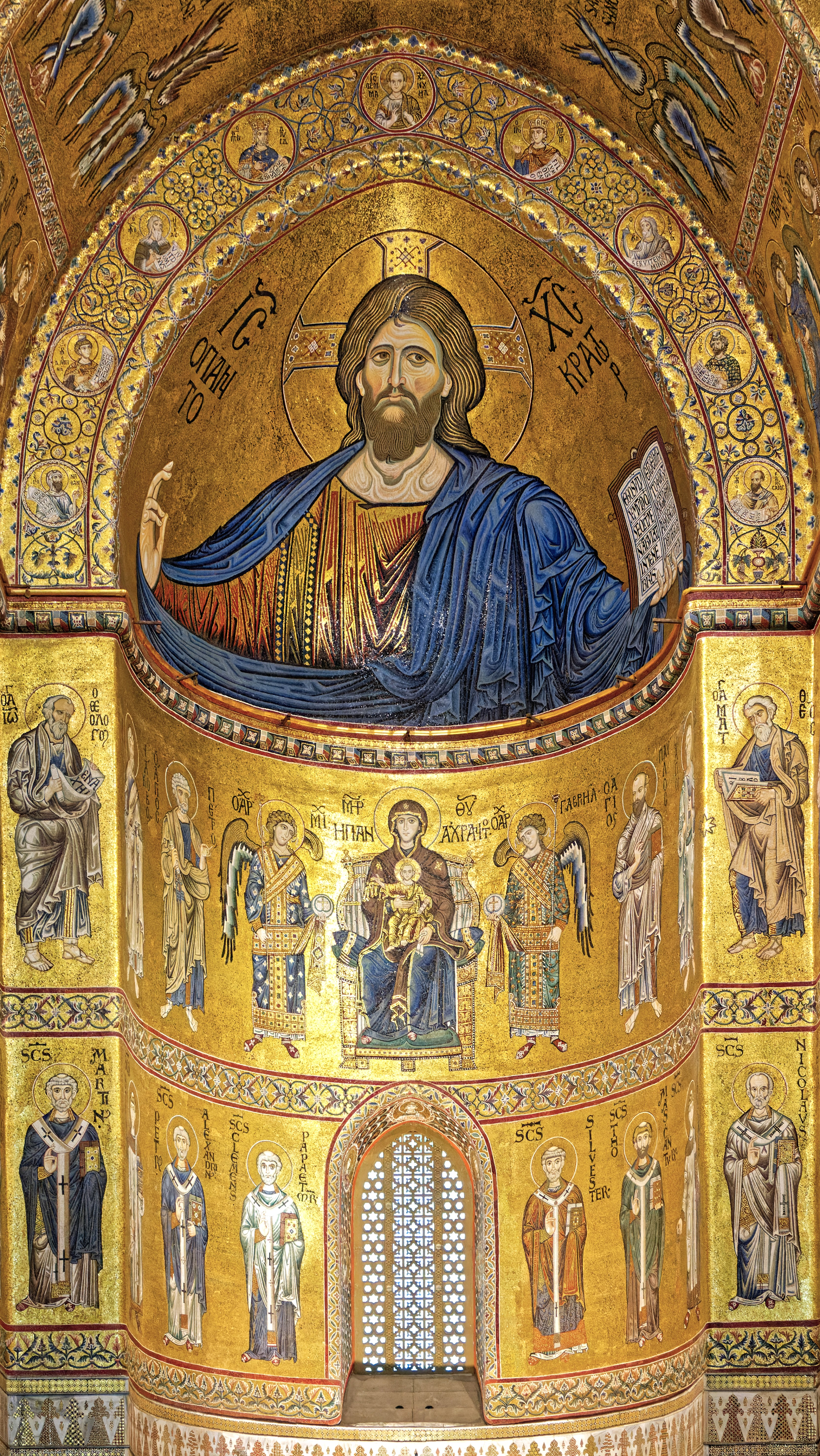
Mosaics in the apse

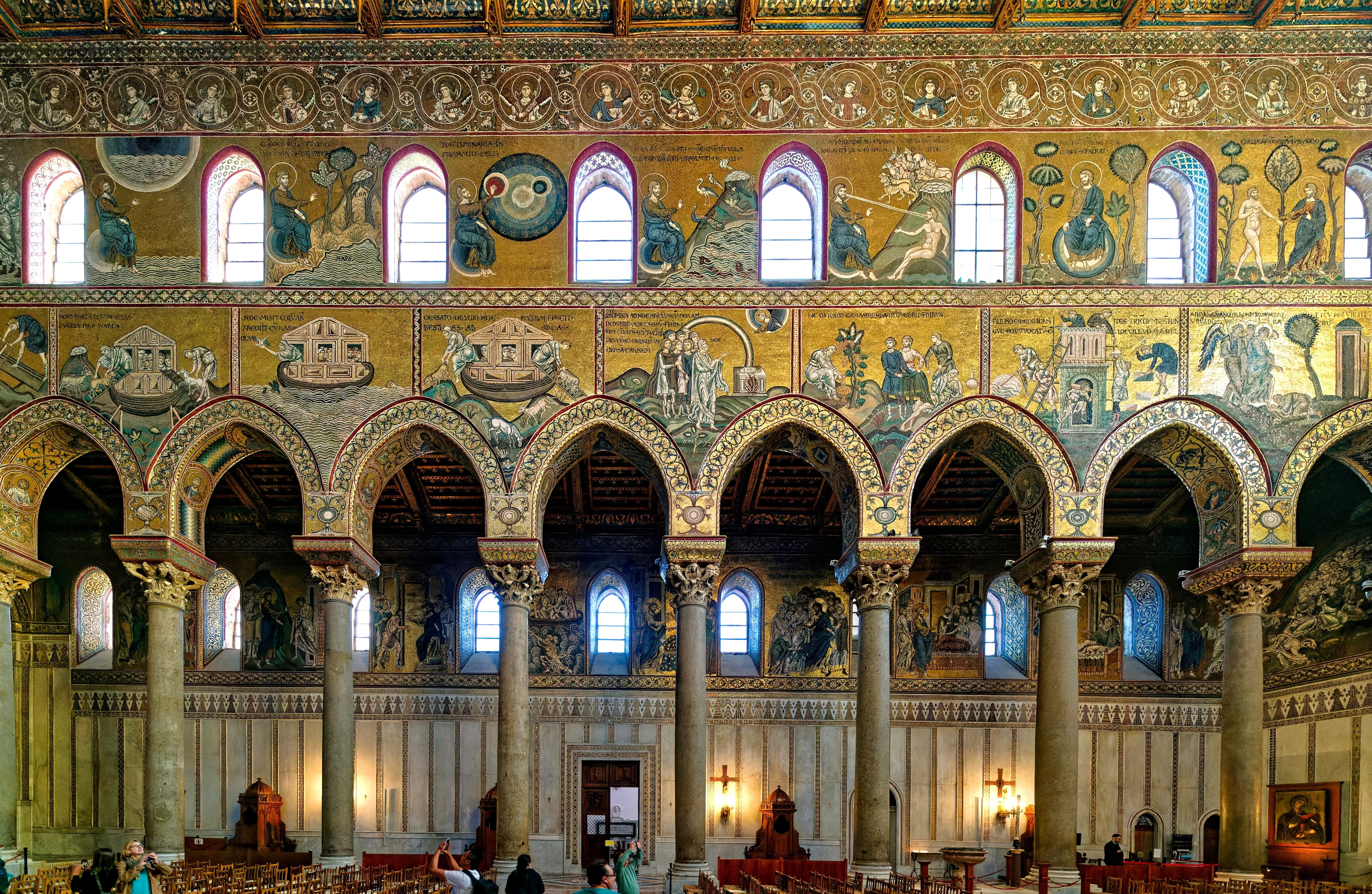
Mosaics in the nave

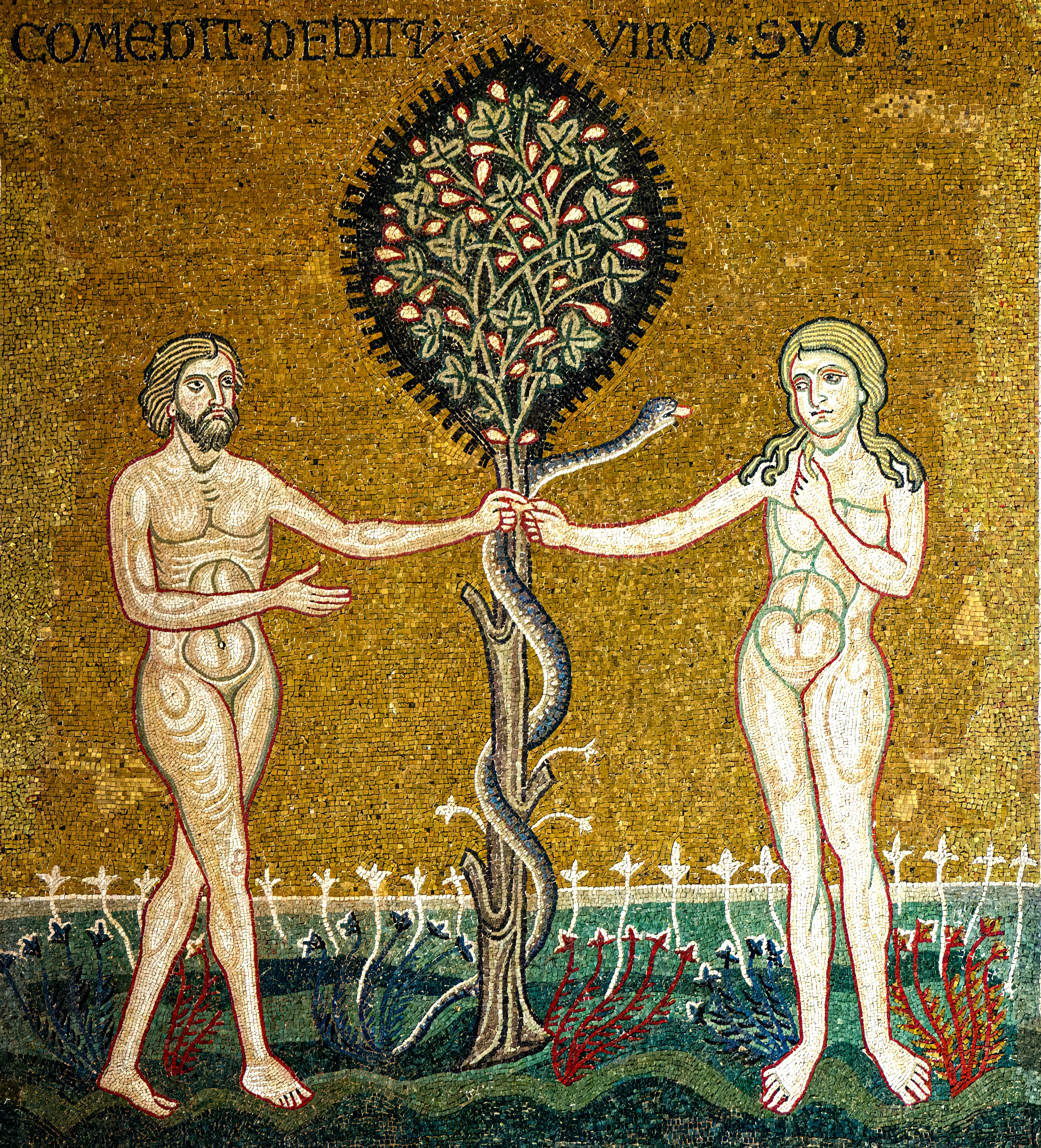
Detail of the mosaic with Adam and Eve and the Tree of Knowledge

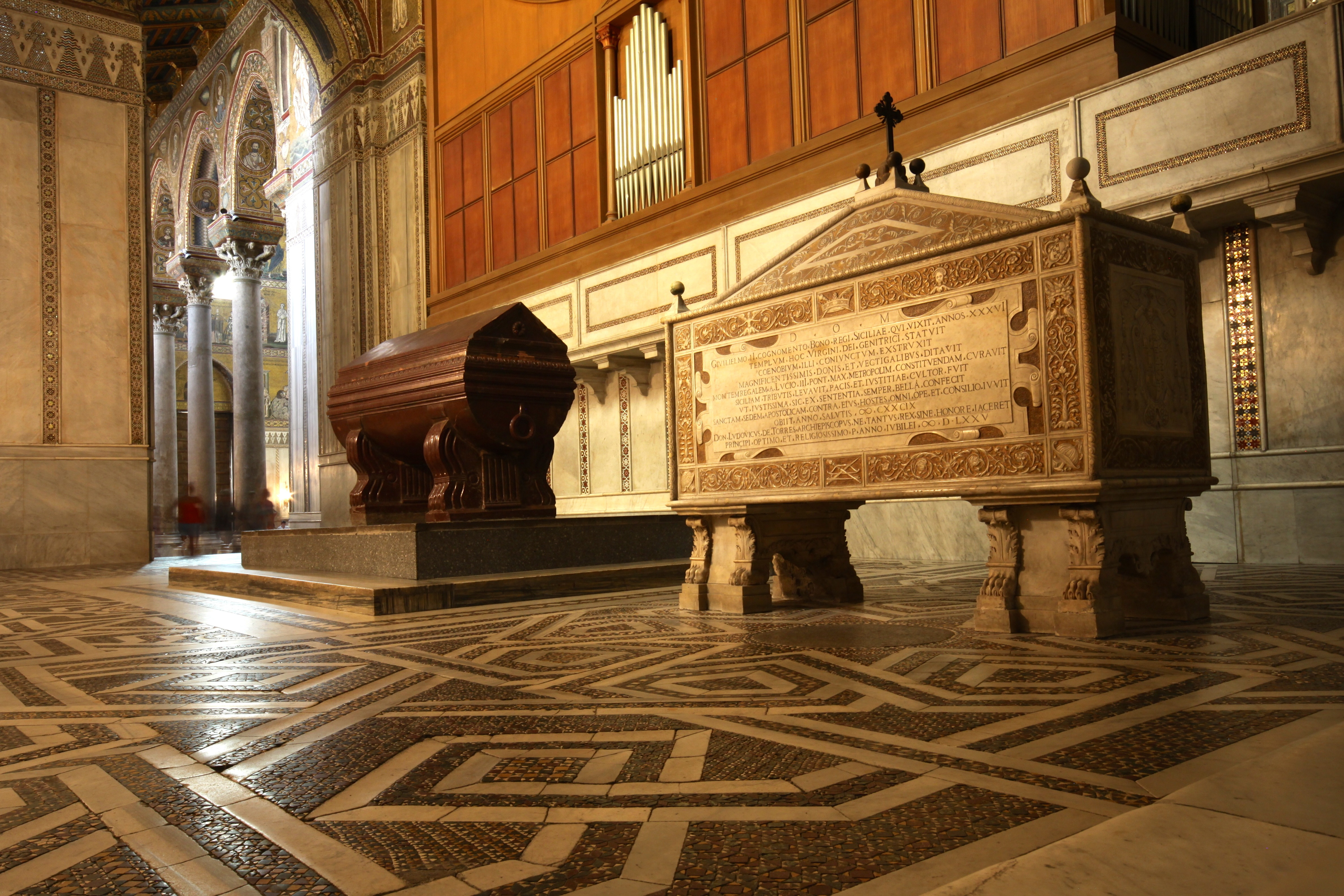
Sarcophagi of William I and William II of Sicily

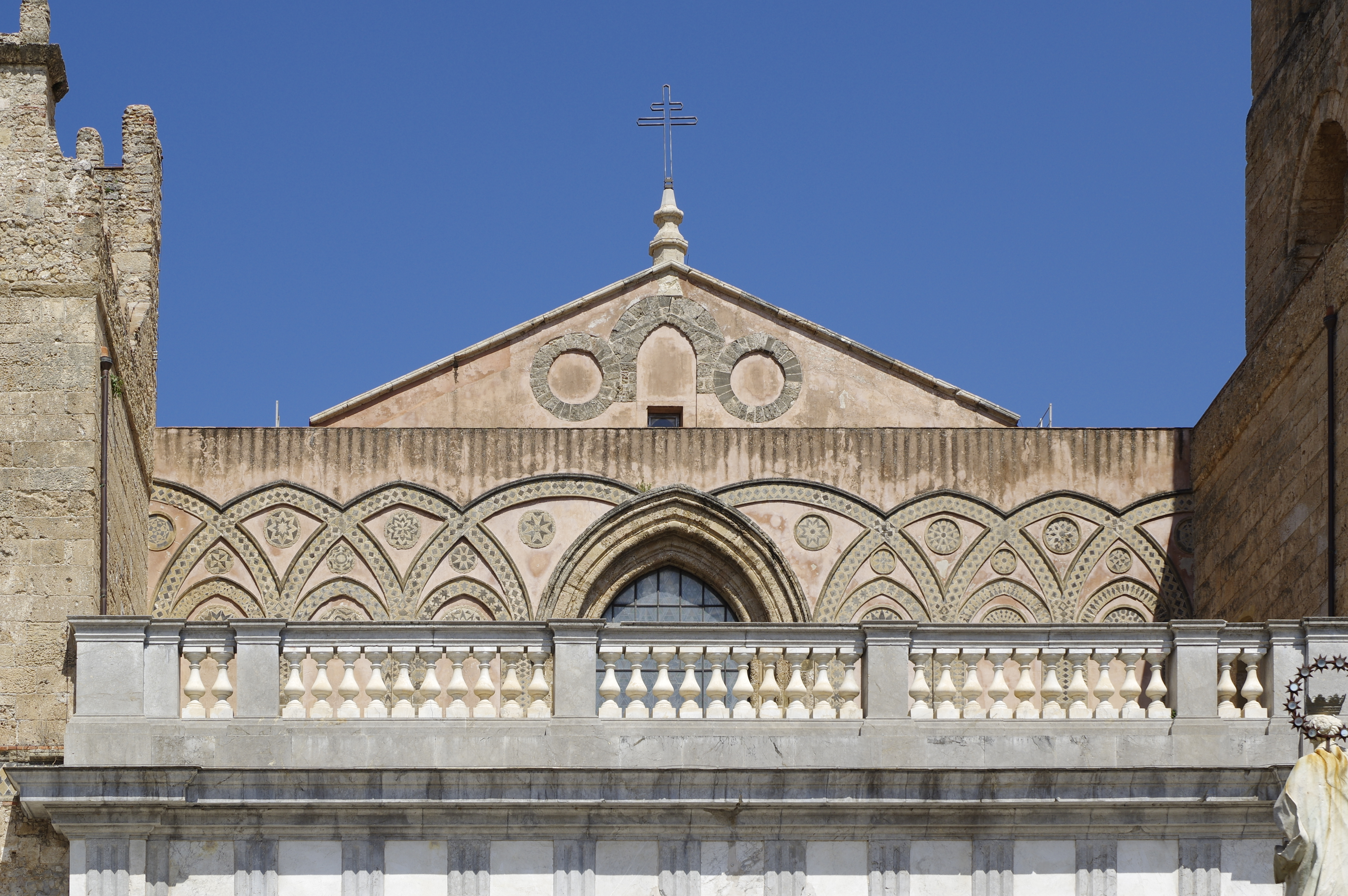
interlacing blind arch on the triangular pediment facade

== Sources ==
- Kitzinger, Ernst (1991). I mosaici di Monreale. Palermo: Flaccovio Editore. ISBN 88-7804-065-7.
- AA. VV. (2004). Il duomo di Monreale - architettura di luce e icona. Abadir.
- Millunzi, Gaetano (1986). Il Duomo di Monreale. Rome: Vivere In.
