= Palazzo Pretorio, Palermo =

Building in Palermo, Italy

Praetorian Palace
- Palazzo Pretorio
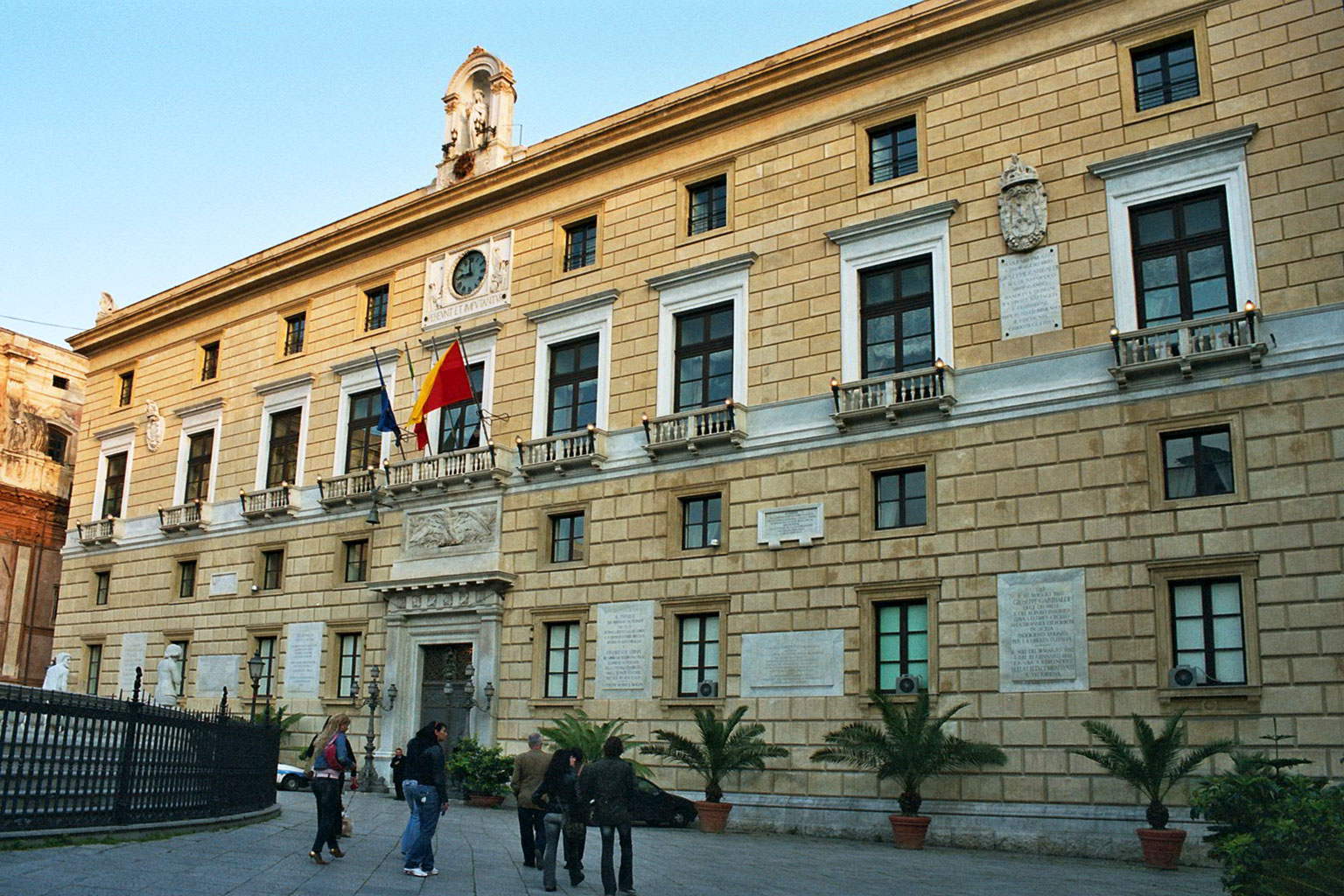
- Façade of the palace. Piazza Pretoria
- Interactive map of the Praetorian Palace area
- Alternative names: Palazzo delle Aquile

General information
- Architectural style: Renaissance Revival
- Location: Palermo, Italy, Italy
- Coordinates: 38°06′54″N 13°21′44″E
- Current tenants: Municipality of Palermo
- Construction started: 1463
- Completed: 1875

Design and construction
- Architects: Giacomo Benfante, Mariano Smiriglio, Giuseppe Damiani Almeyda

Website
- Comune of Palermo

The Praetorian Palace (Italian: Palazzo Pretorio), also known as Palace of the Eagles (Italian: Palazzo delle Aquile), is a palace of Palermo. The building has an important role in the political life of the city, since it houses the mayor and the offices of the municipality of Palermo. It is located in the heart of the historic centre, between Via Maqueda, Piazza Pretoria and Piazza Bellini, in the same area of other well-known architectural landmarks like the Fontana Pretoria, the Baroque church of Santa Caterina and the Medieval churches of Martorana and San Cataldo (both of them are World Heritage Sites).

== History ==
Until the late 19th century the origin of the palace remained cloaked under a shadow of legend. For centuries the general view was that the palace was built in the 14th century from the will of King Frederick III of Sicily. However, in 1875 the scholars Fedele Pollacci Nuccio and Giuseppe Meli made public the documents through which the construction was decided in 1463. The main advocate of the construction was the magistrate Pietro Speciale.

The construction was carried out between 1463 and 1478 under the guidance of Giacomo Benfante. Decades later, in 1553, the palace was enlarged and its facade was redone. A new architectural intervention was made by Mariano Smiriglio between 1615 and 1617. In 19th century, between 1873 and 1875, the architect Giuseppe Damiani Almeyda was the author of a new renovation. Through this intervention the palace assumed the current Renaissance Revival-Neoclassical appearance.

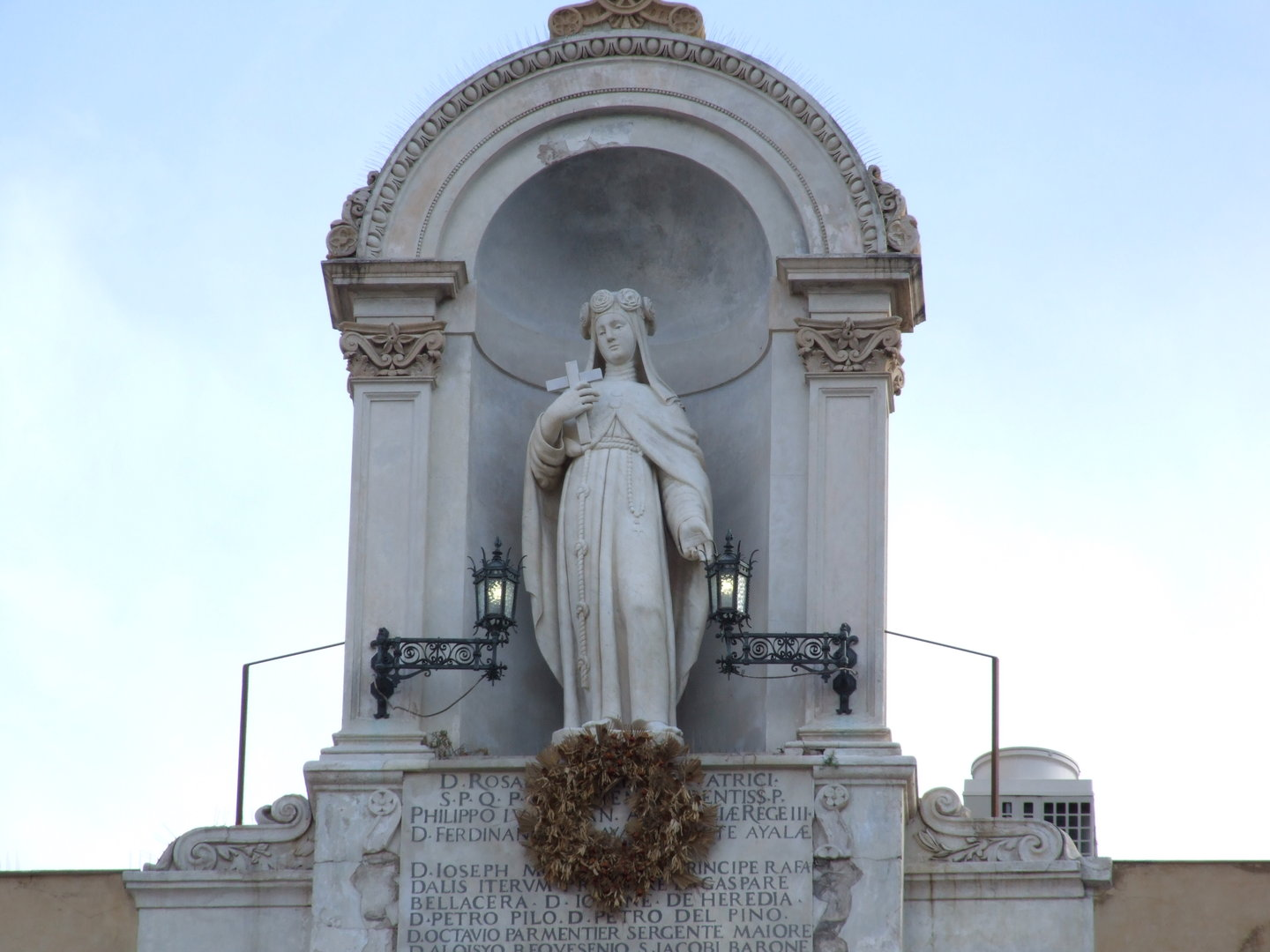
Statue of Saint Rosalia, Carlo D'Aprile

== Description ==
The main facade presents three orders of eight windows and a single sequence of nine balconies in the main floor (the "piano nobile"). Under the central balcony there is a high relief depicting an imposing marble eagle, work of Salvatore Valenti. Over the main facade's cornice, in central position, there is the statue of Saint Rosalia, work of Carlo D'Aprile (1661). Under the statue, it is located a big clock arrived from Paris in 1864. At the top of the building, the four angles are decorated with four eagles, work of Domenico Costantino.

Several artworks are kept inside the palace. The most important is the Genio di Palazzo Pretorio, also known as "Palermu u Nicu", sculpture attributed to Domenico Gagini. In addition, the palace houses some weapons belonged to Napoleon.

The most famous rooms of the palace are the "Sala Rossa" (seat of the mayor), the "Sala Gialla" (seat of the municipal government), the "Sala delle Lapidi" (seat of the city council) and the "Sala Garibaldi".

== Gallery ==
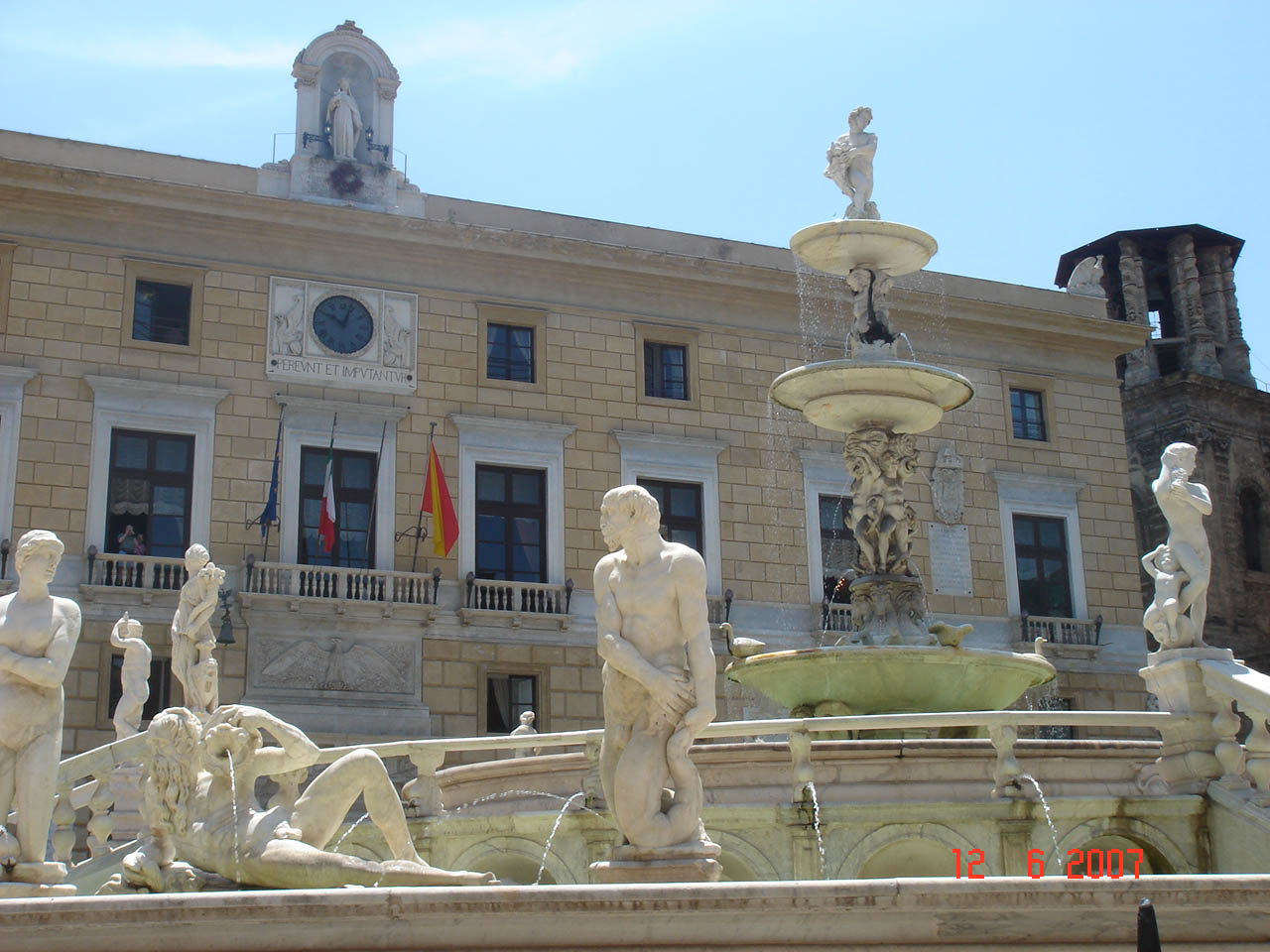
The facade from the Fontana Pretoria

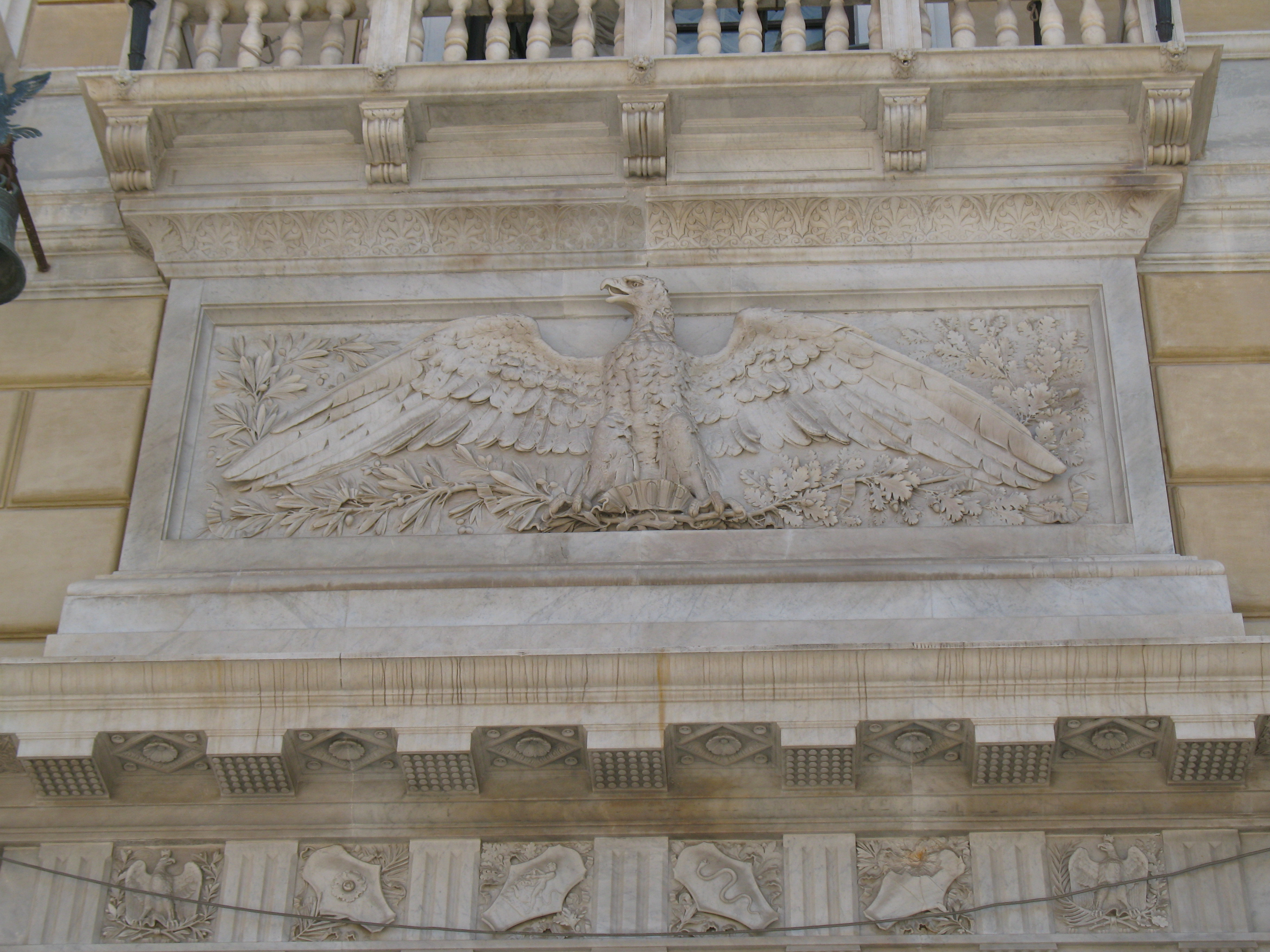
High relief of the eagle

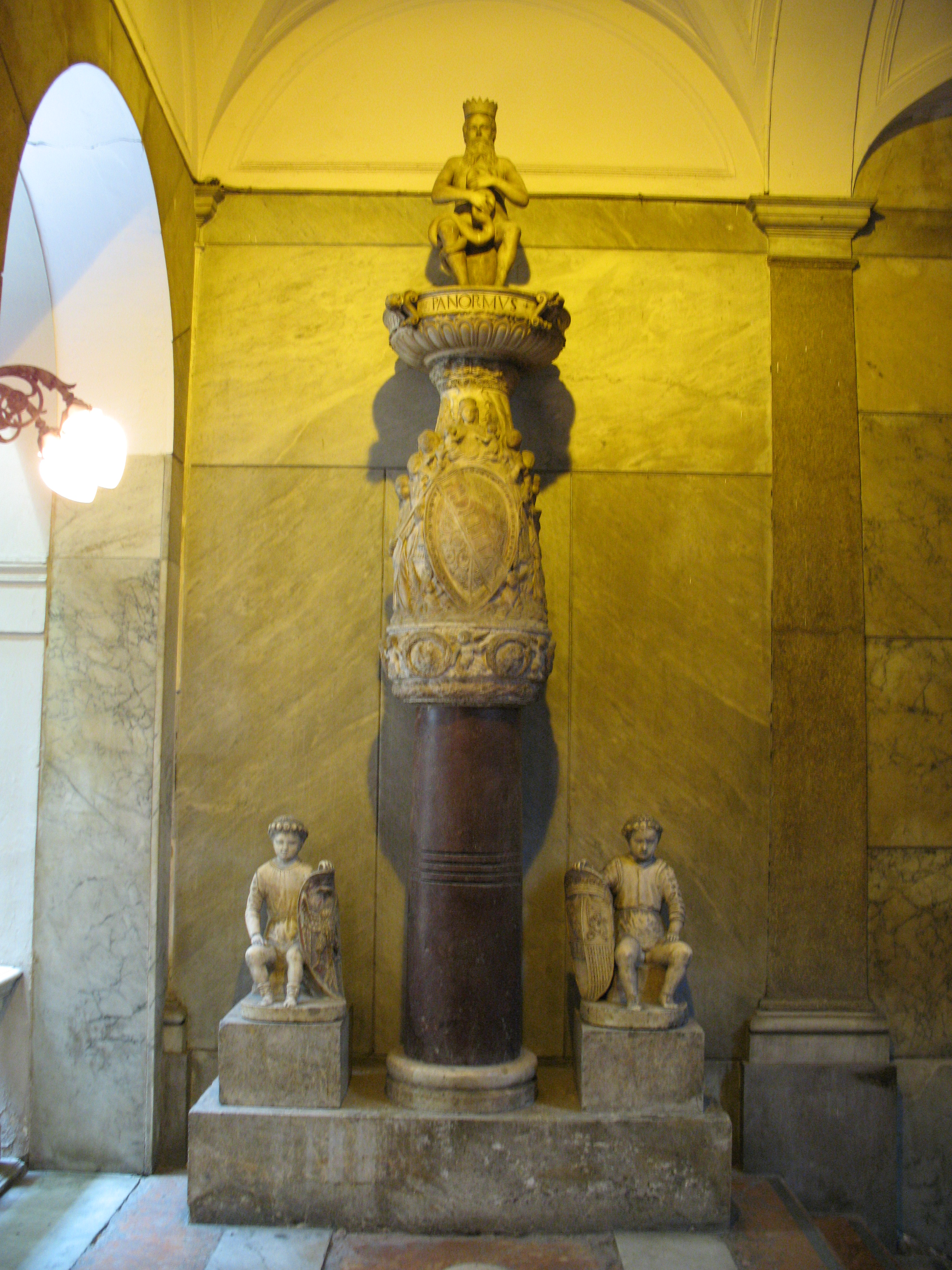
Genio di Palazzo Pretorio

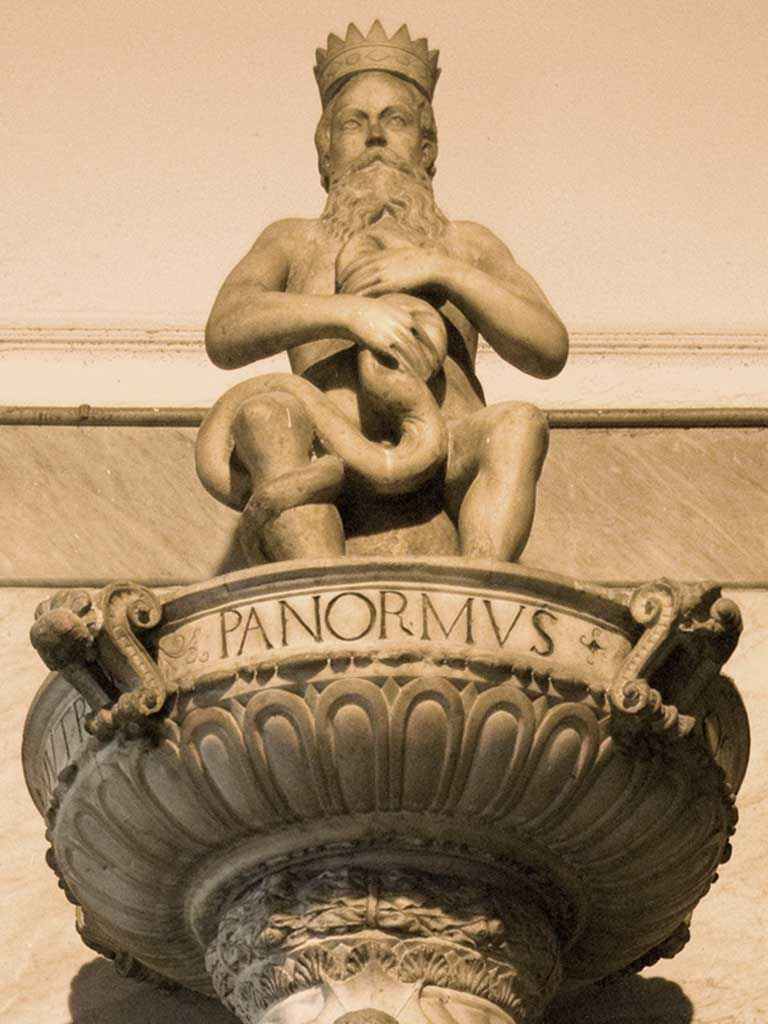
Genius of Palermo

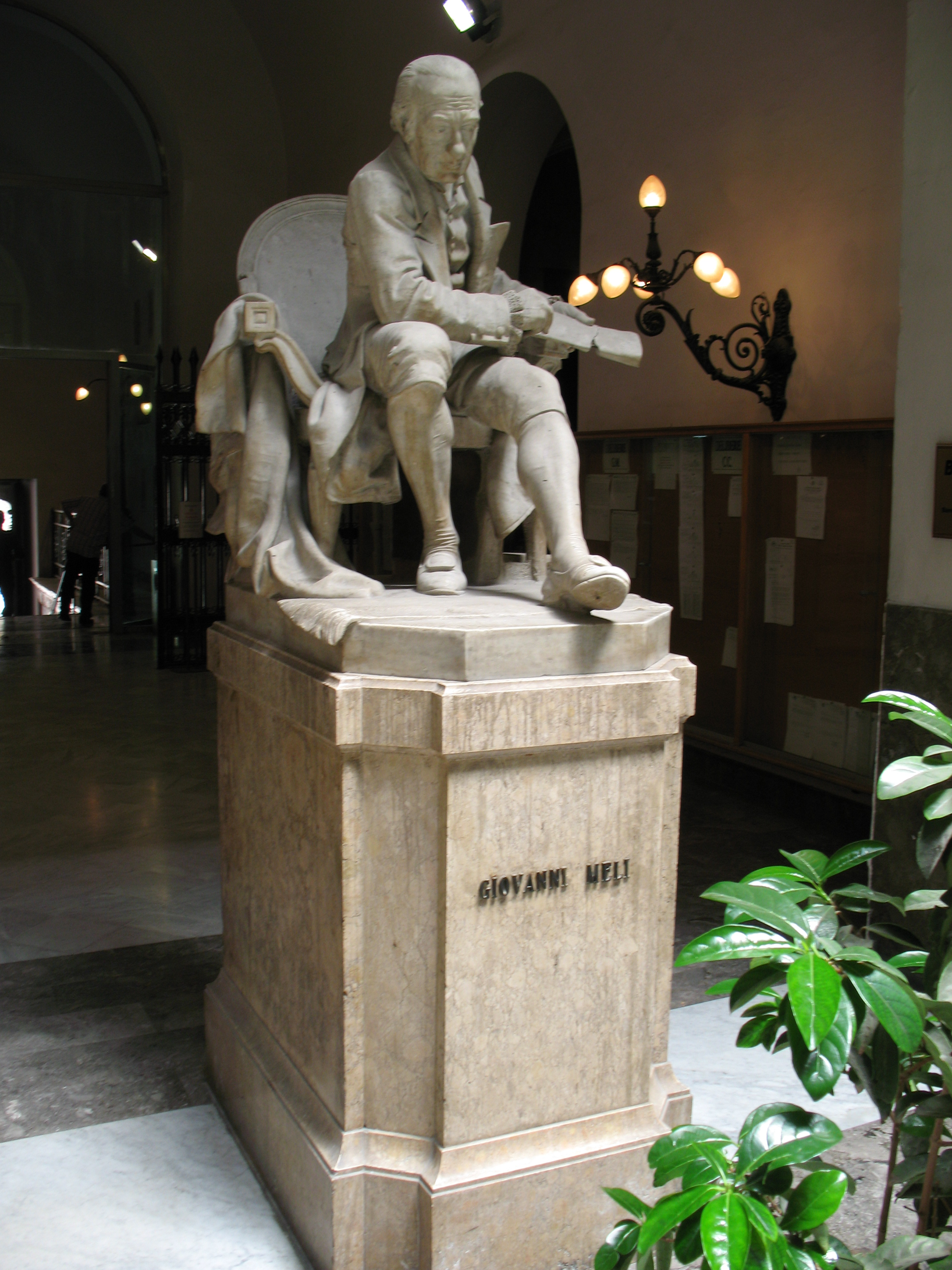
Monument to Giovanni Meli

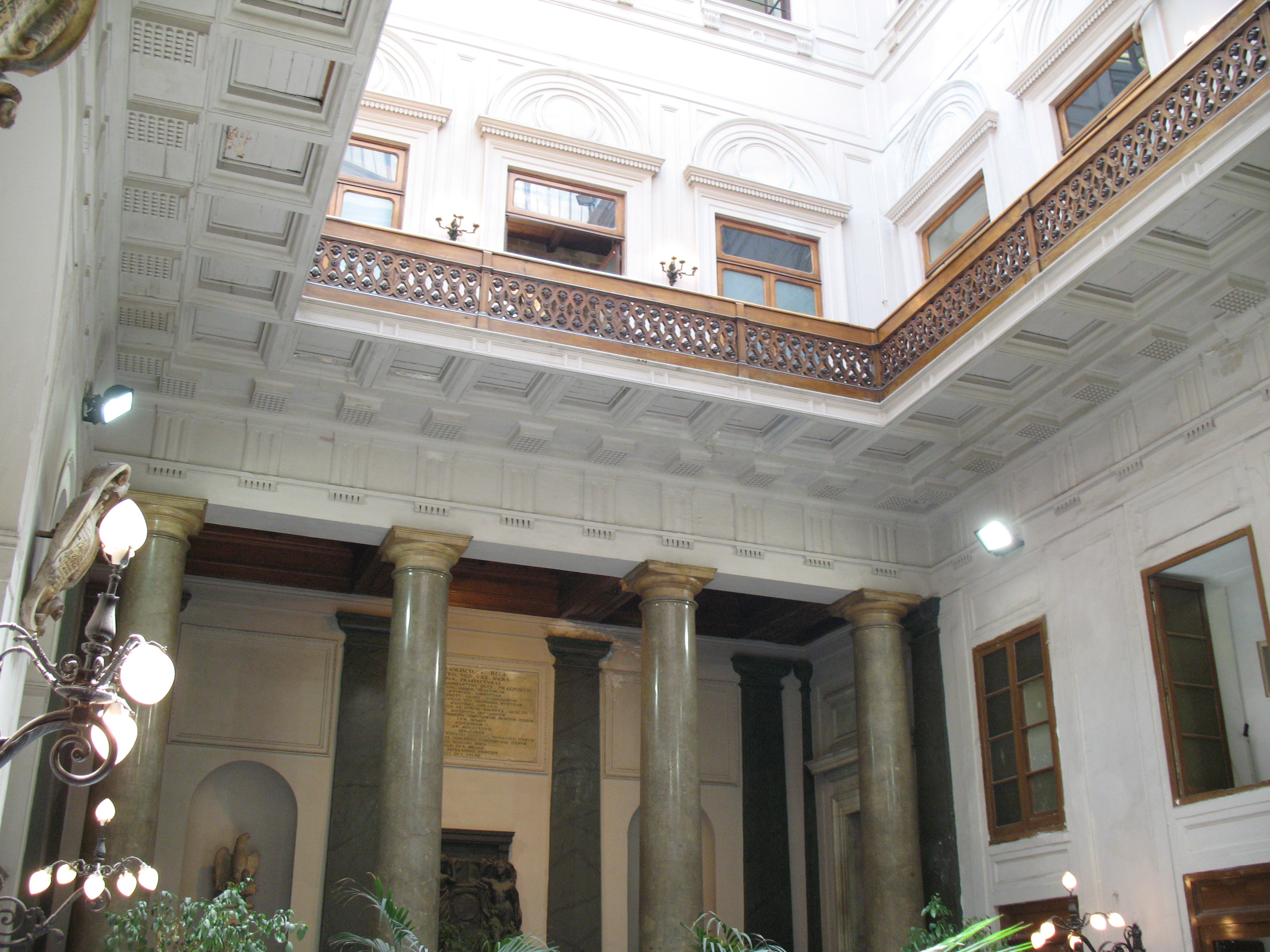
Courtyard
