= Piazza Bellini, Palermo =

Piazza in Palermo, Italy

Piazza Bellini
- Piazza Bellini, the facades of the churches of Martorana and San Cataldo
- Interactive map of Piazza Bellini
- Location: Palermo, Sicily, Italy
- Coordinates: 38°06′54.08″N 13°21′45.07″E

Piazza Bellini is a square of Palermo. It is located in the heart of the city, near the central Via Maqueda and Piazza Pretoria, in the quarter of the Kalsa, within the historic centre of Palermo.

In its perimeter are located two buildings dating back to the era of Norman Sicily: the churches of Martorana and San Cataldo (both are UNESCO World Heritage Sites as part of Arab-Norman Palermo and the Cathedral Churches of Cefalù and Monreale). In the square are also located the Baroque church of Santa Caterina, the Bellini Theatre and the posterior facade of Palazzo Pretorio, headquarters of the Comune of Palermo. Moreover, in the square some ruins of Punic walls are visible. Near the square, in Via Maqueda, has its location the Faculty of Jurisprudence.

== Gallery ==
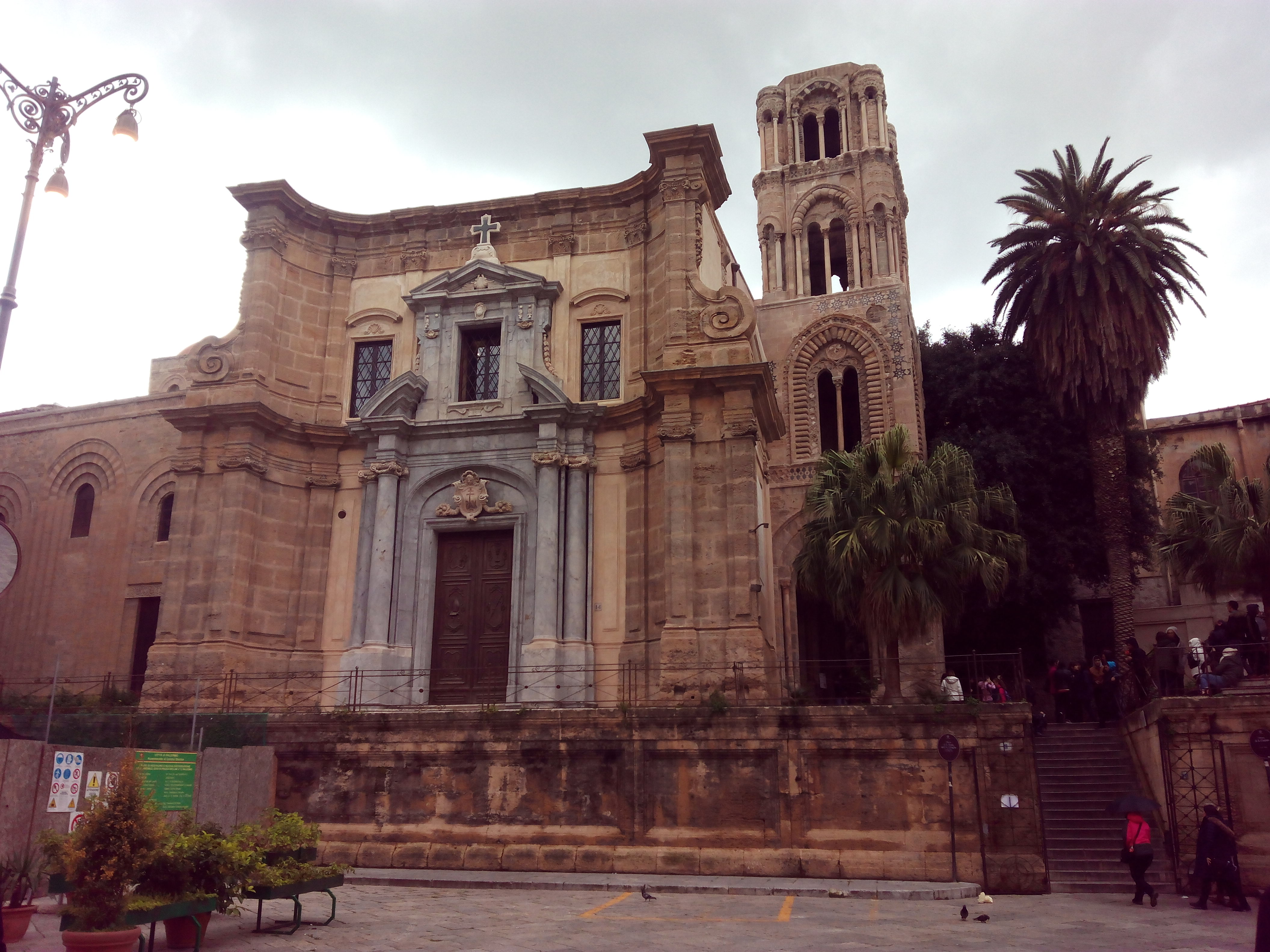
Church of Martorana

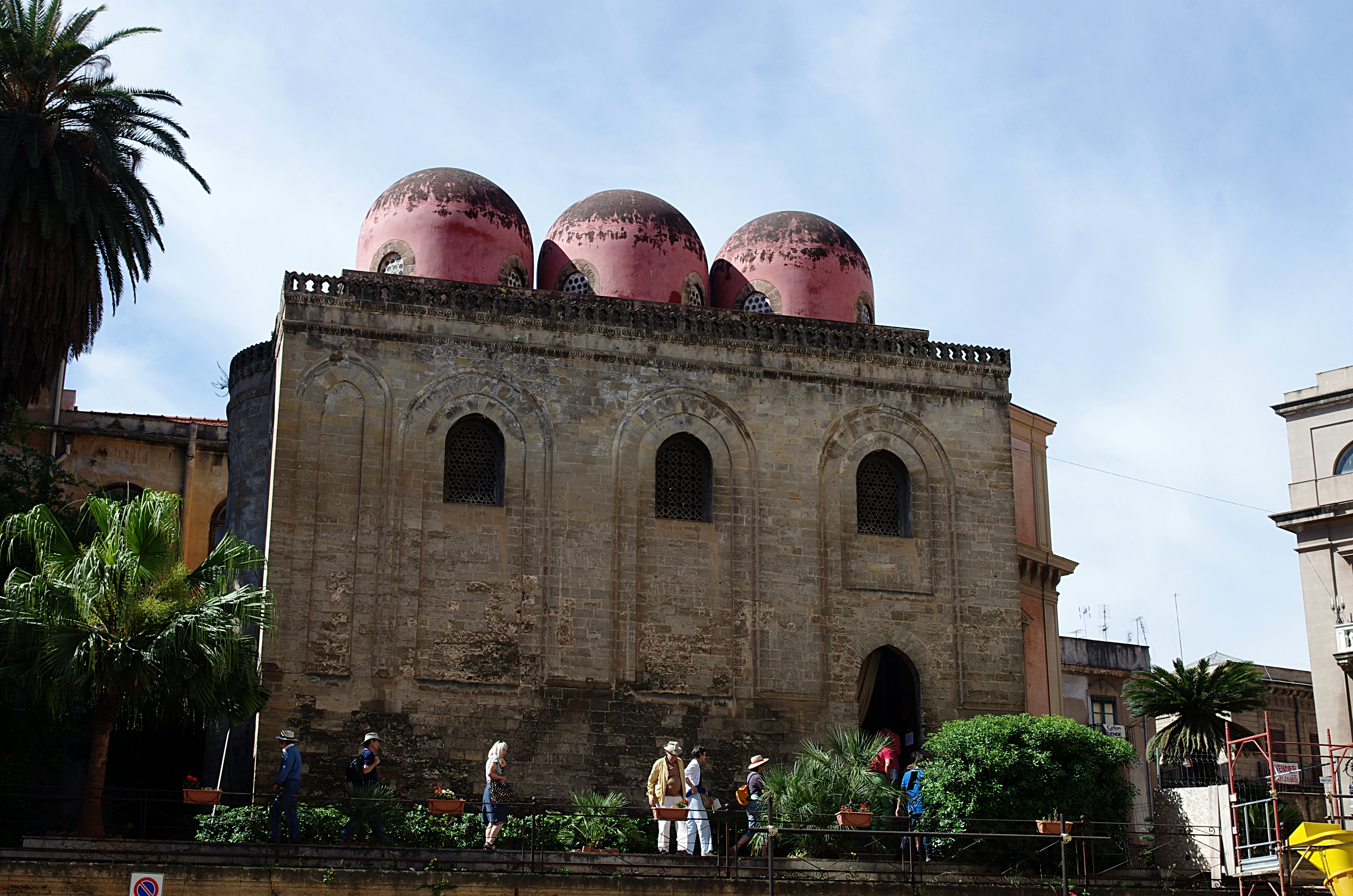
Church of San Cataldo

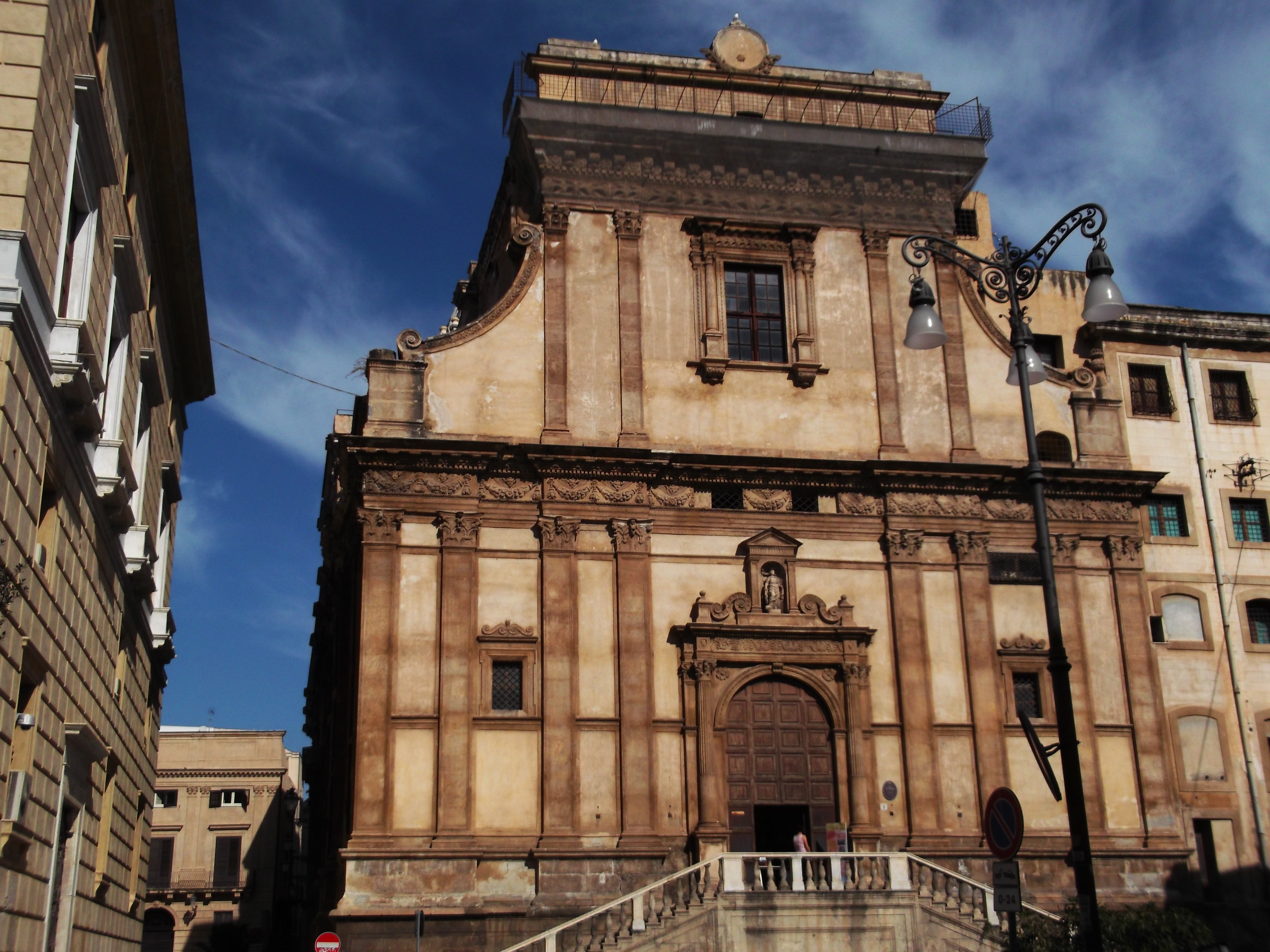
Church of Santa Caterina

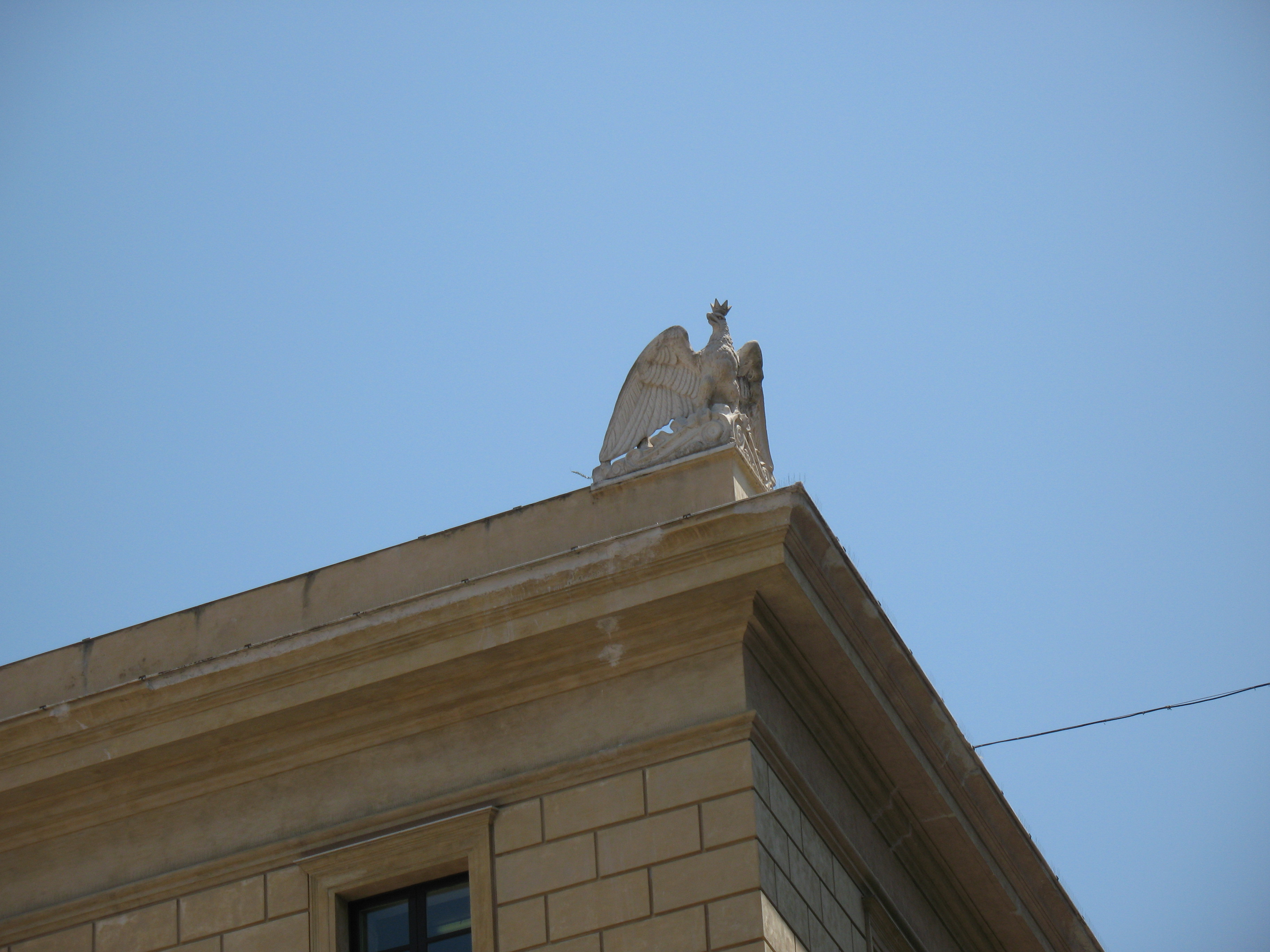
Palazzo Pretorio
