= Palazzo Bonocore, Palermo =

Palazzo Bonocore
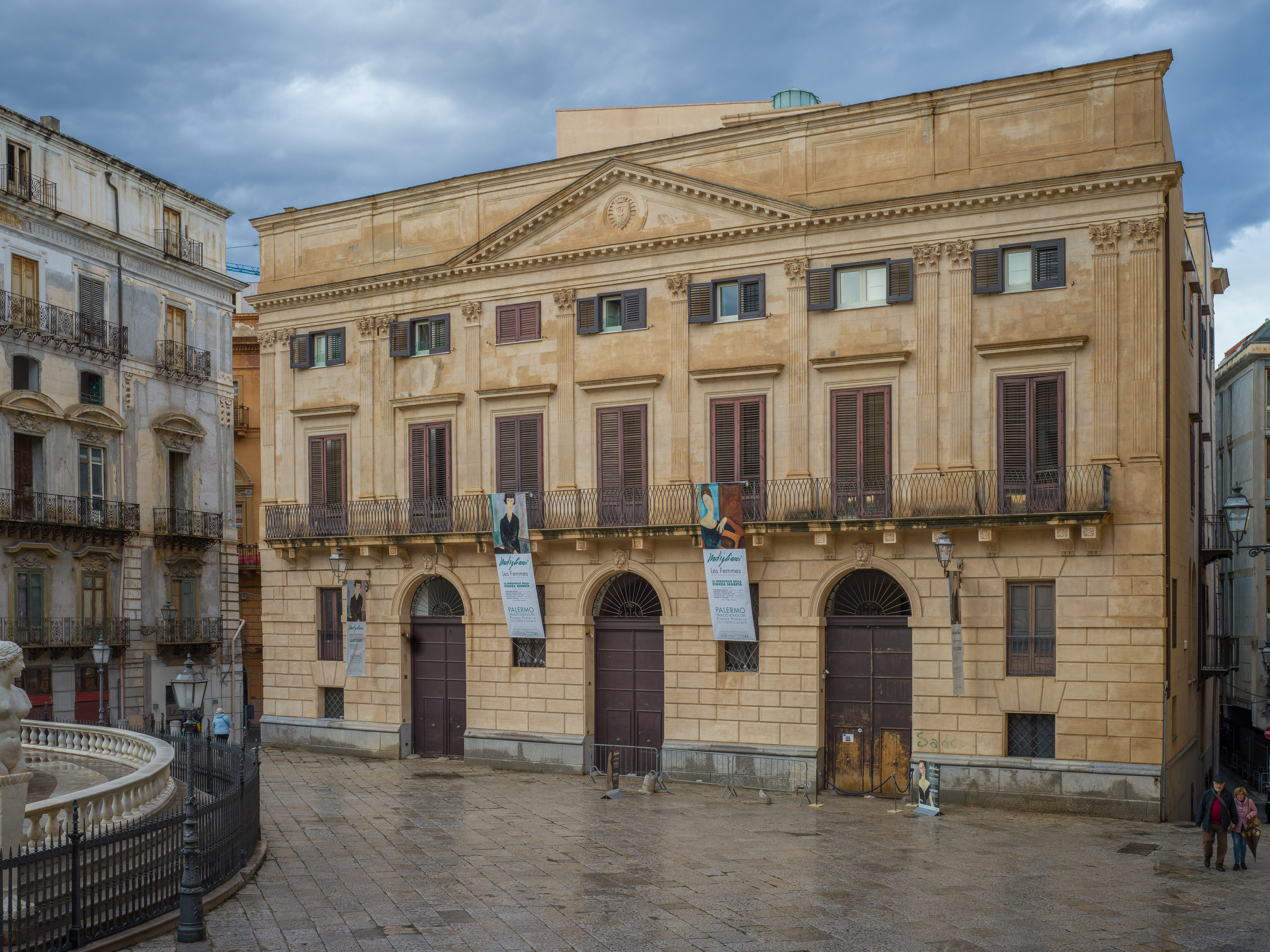
- Palace facade, to the left is the edge of Fontana Pretoria

General information
- Architectural style: Neoclassical
- Location: Palermo, Italy
- Coordinates: 38.11576°N 13.36219°E

The Palazzo Bonocore is a Neoclassical palace located on the north side of Piazza Pretoria in central Palermo, region of Sicily, Italy.

== History ==
The palace was originally built in the 16th century by the Di Carlo Family. By 1593, it belonged to the senator of Palermo, Stefano Conte, who sold it to the Gastone Family. By the 18th century, Francesco Gastone, presidente of the local tribunal, refurbished the palace on the occasion of the marriage of his daughter with Francesco Antonio Lo Faso, Duke of Serradifalco. The latter's family occupied the palace until 1829, continuing the decoration of the palace in a Neoclassical style. In 1873, Salvatore Bonocore a wealthy merchant bought the palace. Since 2015, the palace has sponsored a multimedia program about history and culture.
