= Santa Caterina, Palermo =

Roman Catholic church in Sicily, Italy

Santa Caterina d'Alessandria
- Chiesa di Santa Caterina (in Italian)
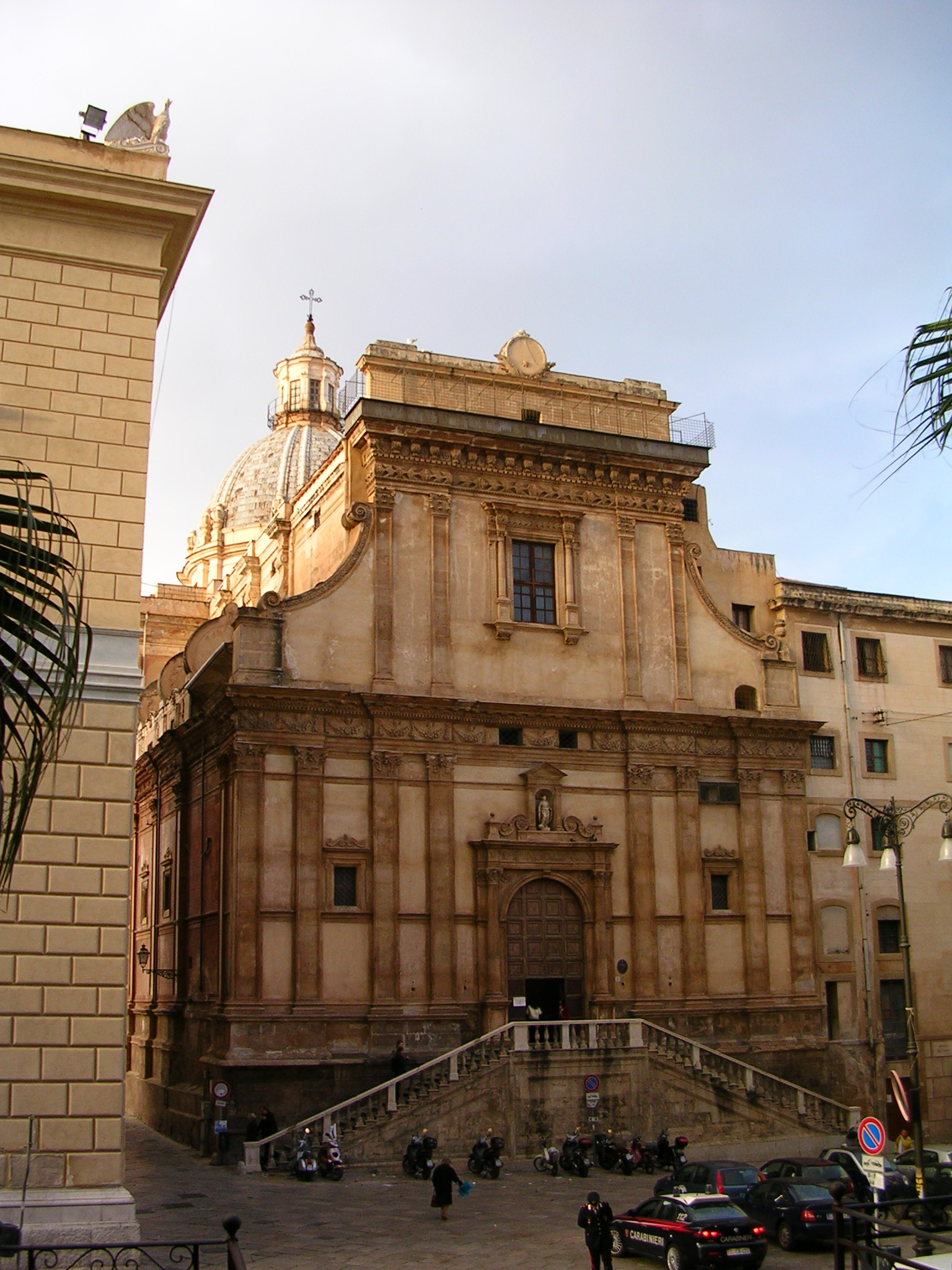
- Main façade of the church facing Piazza Bellini

Religion
- Affiliation: Roman Catholic
- Province: Archdiocese of Palermo
- Rite: Roman Rite

Location
- Location: Palermo, Italy
- Interactive map of Santa Caterina d'Alessandria
- Coordinates: 38°06′56″N 13°21′45.37″E

Architecture
- Style: Sicilian Baroque, Rococo, Renaissance
- Groundbreaking: 1566
- Completed: 1596

Website
- https://www.monasterosantacaterina.com/?lang=en

Santa Caterina d'Alessandria or Saint Catherine of Alexandria is a Roman Catholic church with a main facade on Piazza Bellini, and a lateral Western facade facing the elaborate Fontana Pretoria, in the historic quarter of Kalsa in the city of Palermo, region of Sicily, Italy. In front of the main facade, across the piazza Bellini, rise the older churches of San Cataldo and Santa Maria dell'Ammiraglio (or the Martorana), while across Piazza Pretoria is the Theatine church of San Giuseppe and the entrance to the Quattro Canti. Refurbished over the centuries, the church retains elements and decorations from the Renaissance, Baroque, and late-Baroque (Rococo) eras. This church is distinct from the Oratorio di Santa Caterina found in the Olivella neighborhood.

== History ==
In 1310, the rich Benvenuta Mastrangelo in her last will endowed the foundation of a female Dominican convent. The monastery was dedicated to Saint Catherine of Alexandria, and was sited on the location of the former palace of George of Antioch, admiral of Roger II of Sicily.

In 1532, it was decided to refurbish and enlarge the church, a work that took place mainly between 1566 and 1596 under the supervision of the Mother Prioress Maria del Carretto. In the past, the design was attributed to Giorgio di Faccio, architect of the Palermitan church of San Giorgio dei Genovesi. However, recent studies show the involvement of the architects Francesco Camilliani of Florence and Antonio Muttone of Lombardy, who were also engaged in the reassembly of the Fontana Pretoria. The new church was inaugurated on 24 November 1596. Many years later, on 16 March 1664, the church was consecrated by the archbishop of Palermo Pietro Martinez y Rubio in the presence of the Viceroy of Sicily Francesco Caetani, 8th Duke of Sermoneta.

During the 19th century the church was damaged on several occasions: during the uprising of 1820–1821; the Sicilian revolution of 1848; the Gancia revolt and the Siege of Palermo in 1860; and the Seven and a Half Days Revolt in 1866.

== Art and architecture ==
The sober, linear Renaissance facade, framed by Corinthian pilasters, opens to a church interior with a dazzling rich decoration of stucco details, statues, colored marbles, frescoes and paintings. A single nave is flanked by shallow chapels until the apse, which has a wide transept.

Above the narthex, or anteroom of the church, is the choir, which was sheltered from the public by metal grates, thus allowing the cloistered nuns to view the mass while separated from the public. Other grated windows in the church, accessible by interior corridors allowed nuns to receive confession and take the eucharist. In the narthex are frescoes depicting the Glory of Saint Catherine and the Glory of the Dominican Sisters, by Filippo Randazzo. There are small sculptural depictions of prominent and venerated nuns of the Dominican order:

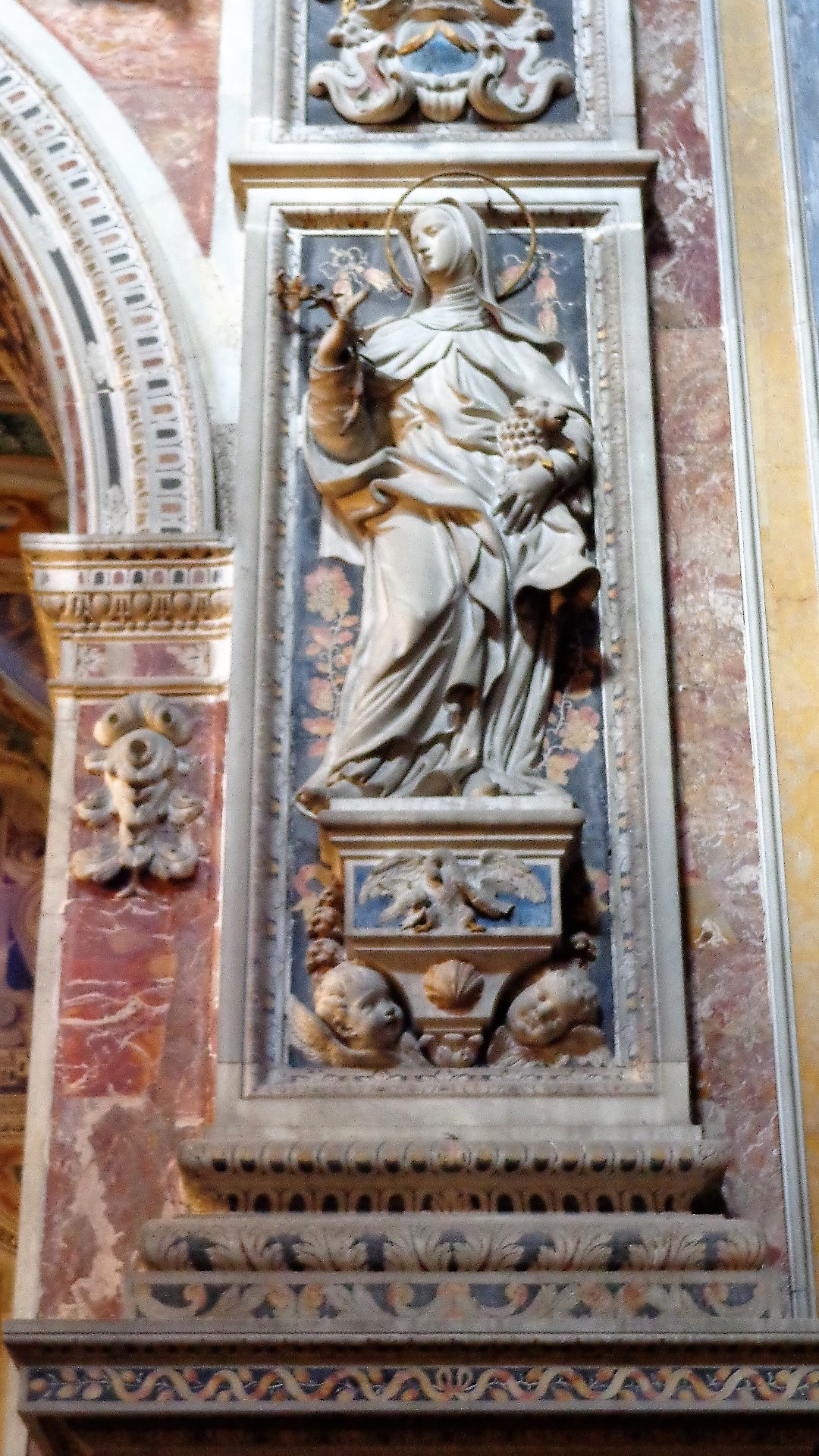
St Agnes of Montepulciano

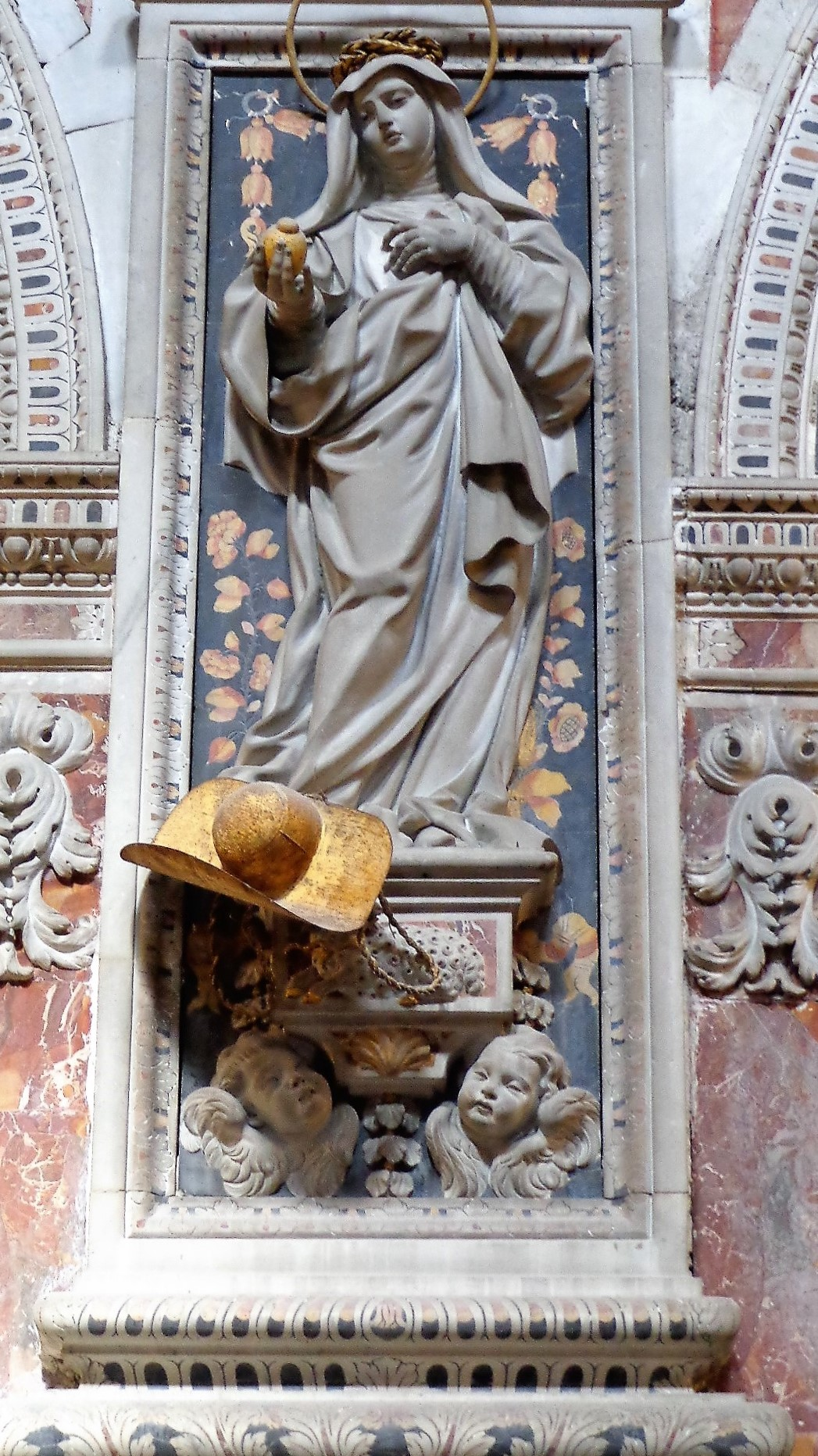
St Catherine of Siena

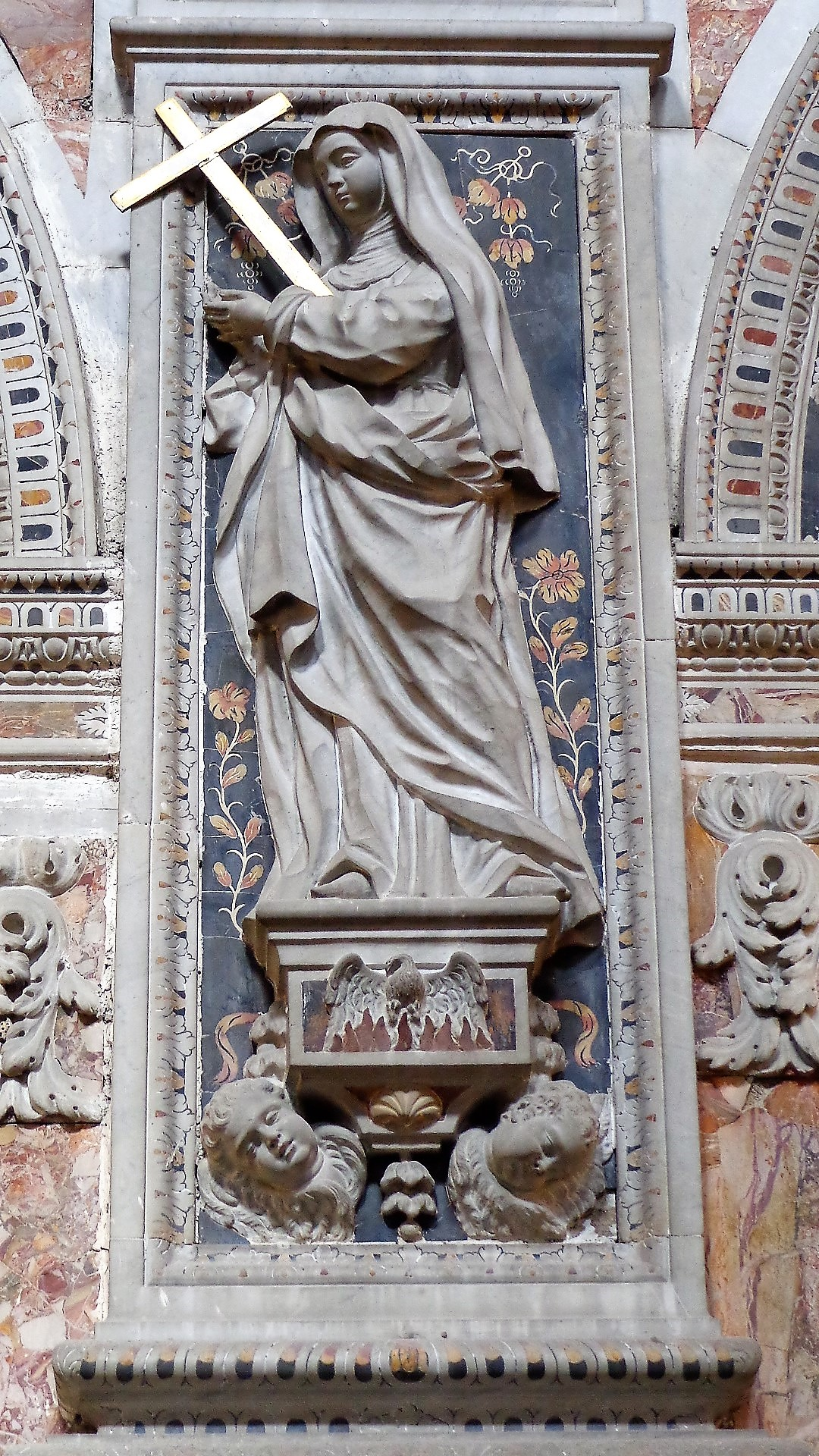
St Catherine de' Ricci

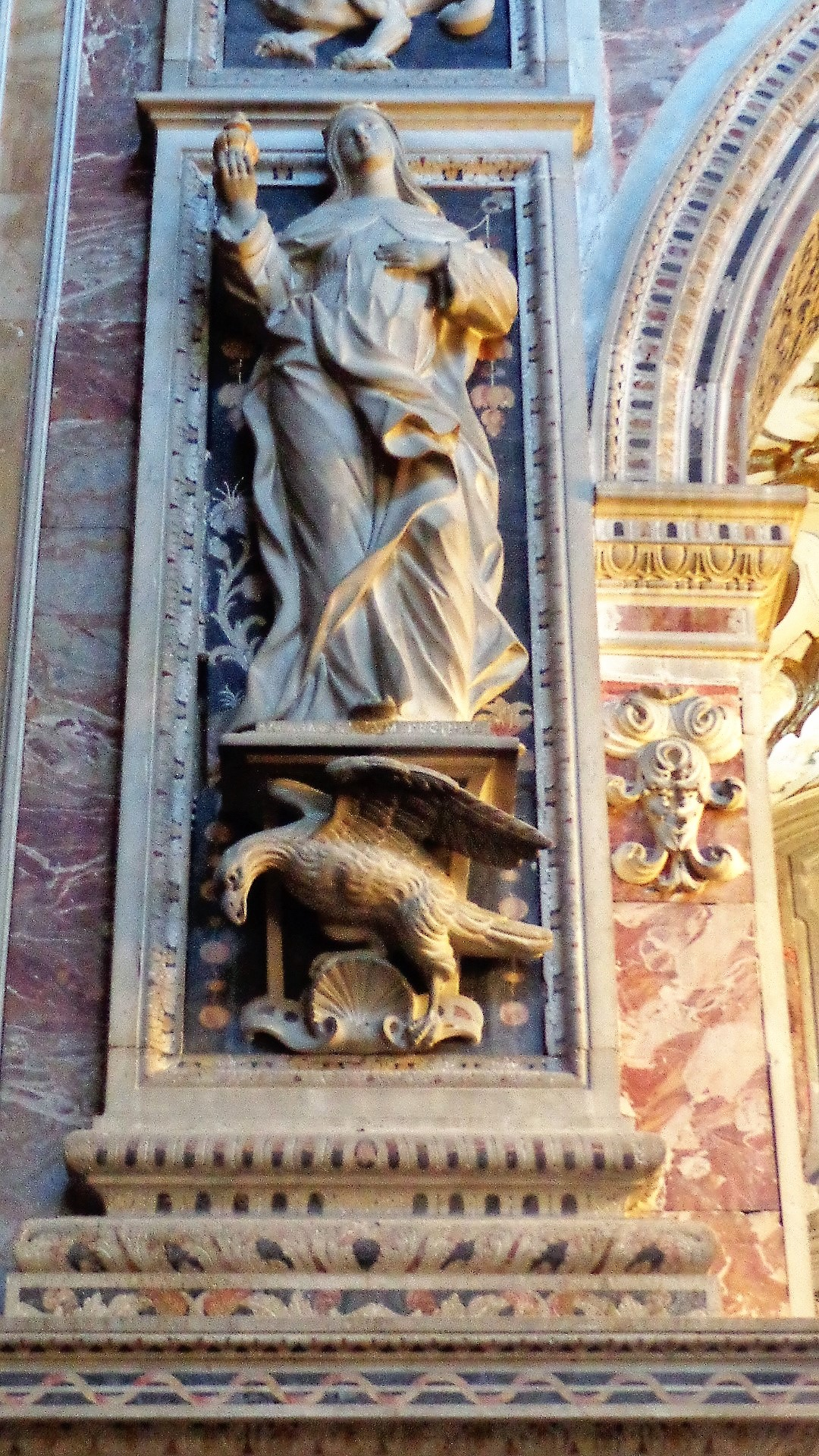
Sancha d'Aragona

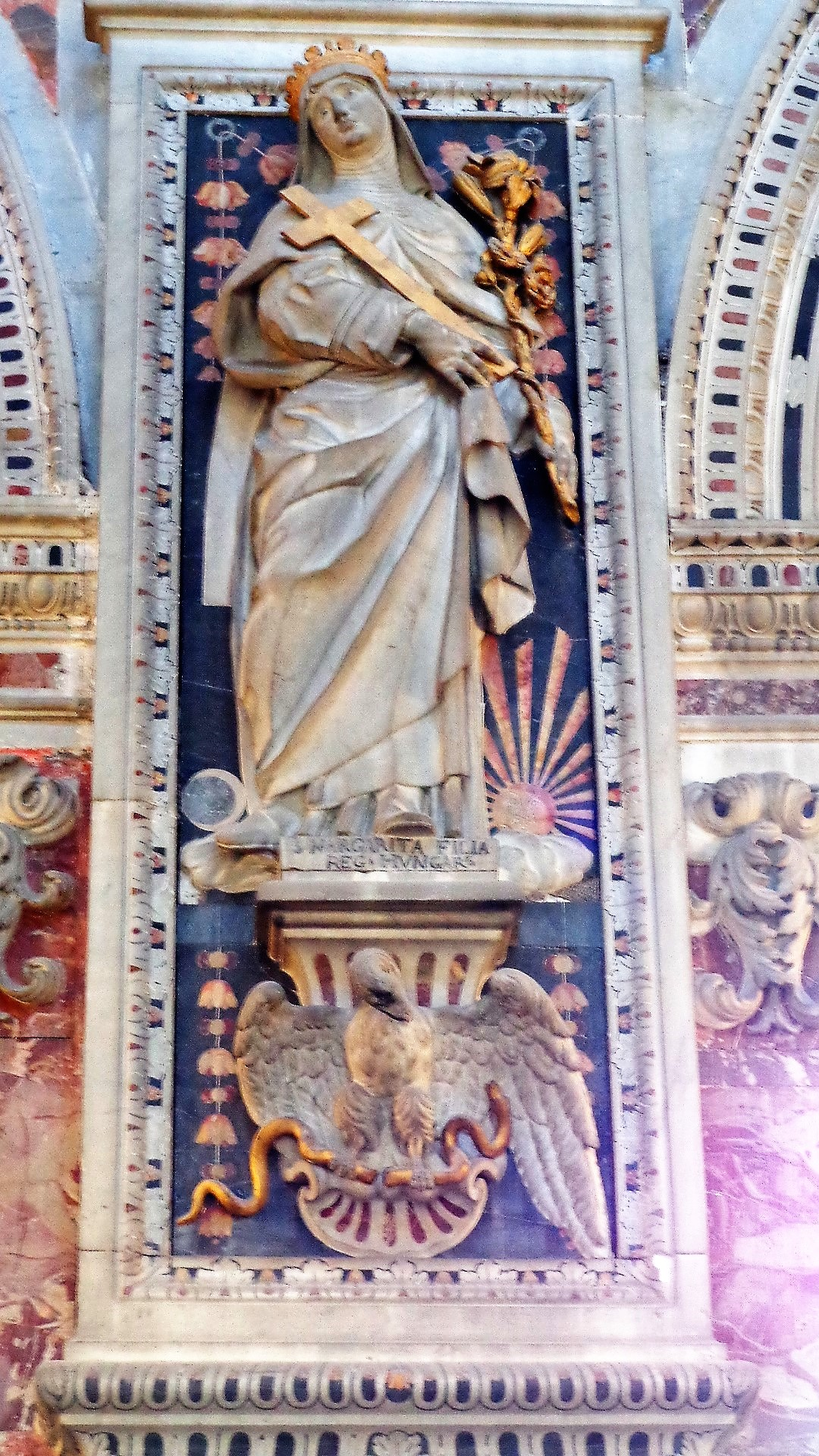
St Margaret of Hungary

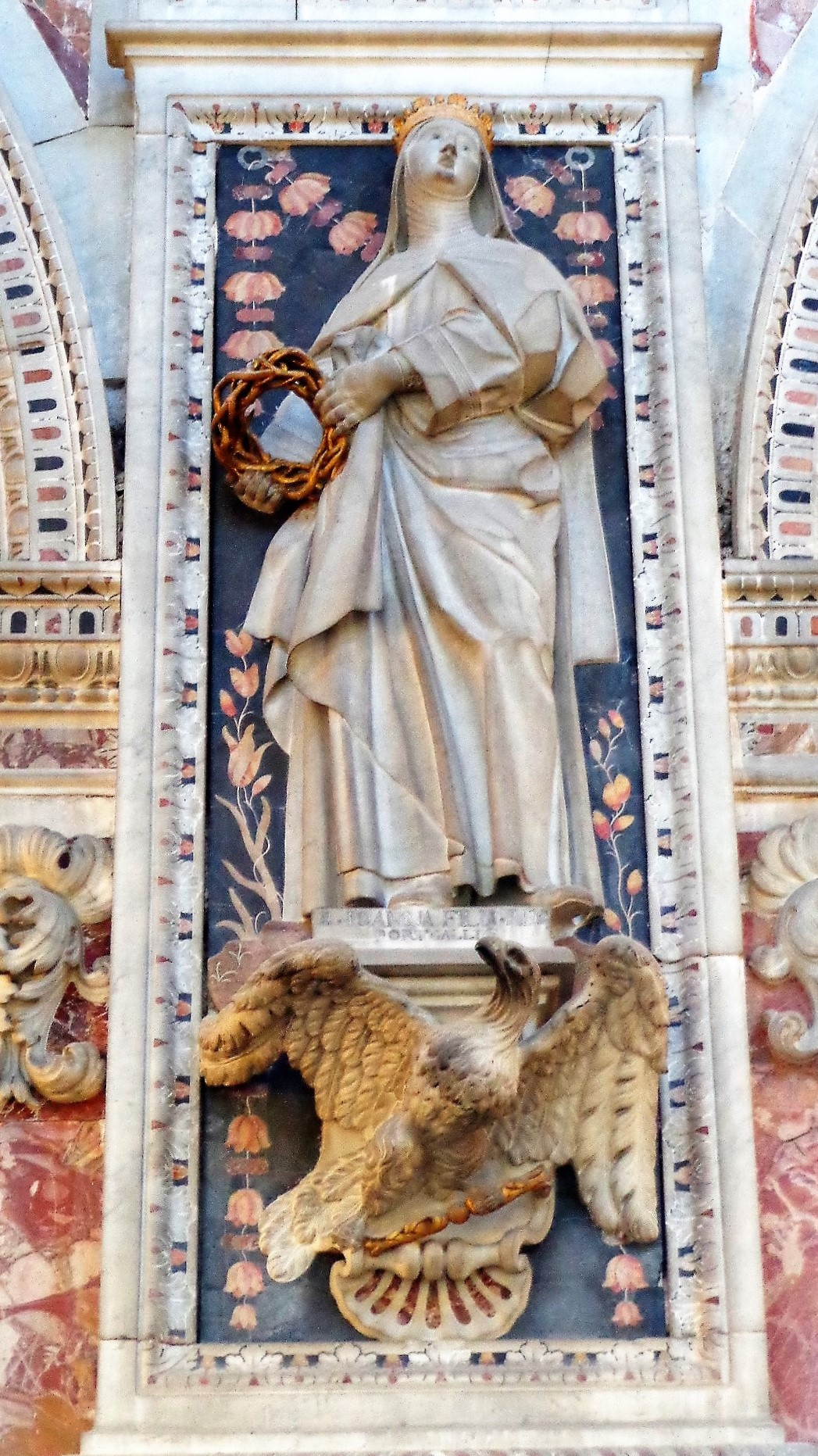
Giovanna of Portugal

The chapels along the right nave are:

- Capella delle Sette Dolori – The main canvas of the Chapel of the Seven Sorrows is an altarpiece depict ing Jesus before the Cross attributed to a followers of Jusepe de Ribera. An additional canvas depicts the Last Supper. A bas-relief depicting Jonah and the Whale is attributed to Giovanni Battista Ragusa.
- Capella del Crocifisso – Flanking the reliquary crucifix on the altar, canvases depict Jesus and the Adulteress and Washing of the Feet. The bas relief depicts the Sacrifice of Isaac by Giovanni Battista Ragusa.
- Capella del Carmine – The main altarpiece depicts the Madonna of Mount Carmel flanked by statues of a young St John the Baptist and St Rosalia. Other canvases depict a Transfiguration and a Virgin intercedes for the souls in Purgatory, by unknown painters. The bas-reliefs depict the Miracle of the Pool of Bethesda (Probatic Pool) and the Baptism of the Ethiopian Eunuch and are attributed to Giovanni Battista Ragusa.
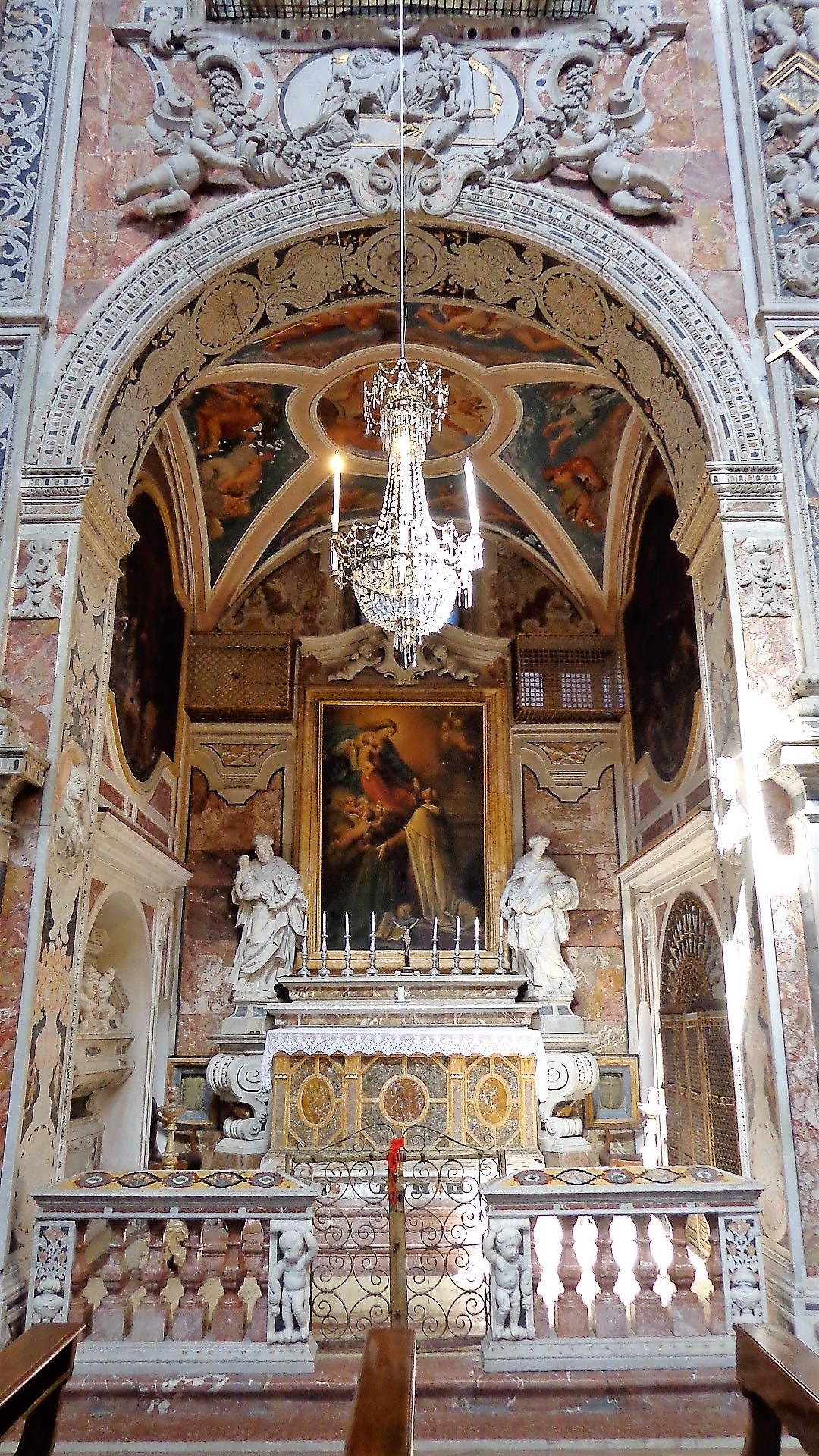
Chapel of the Seven Sorrows

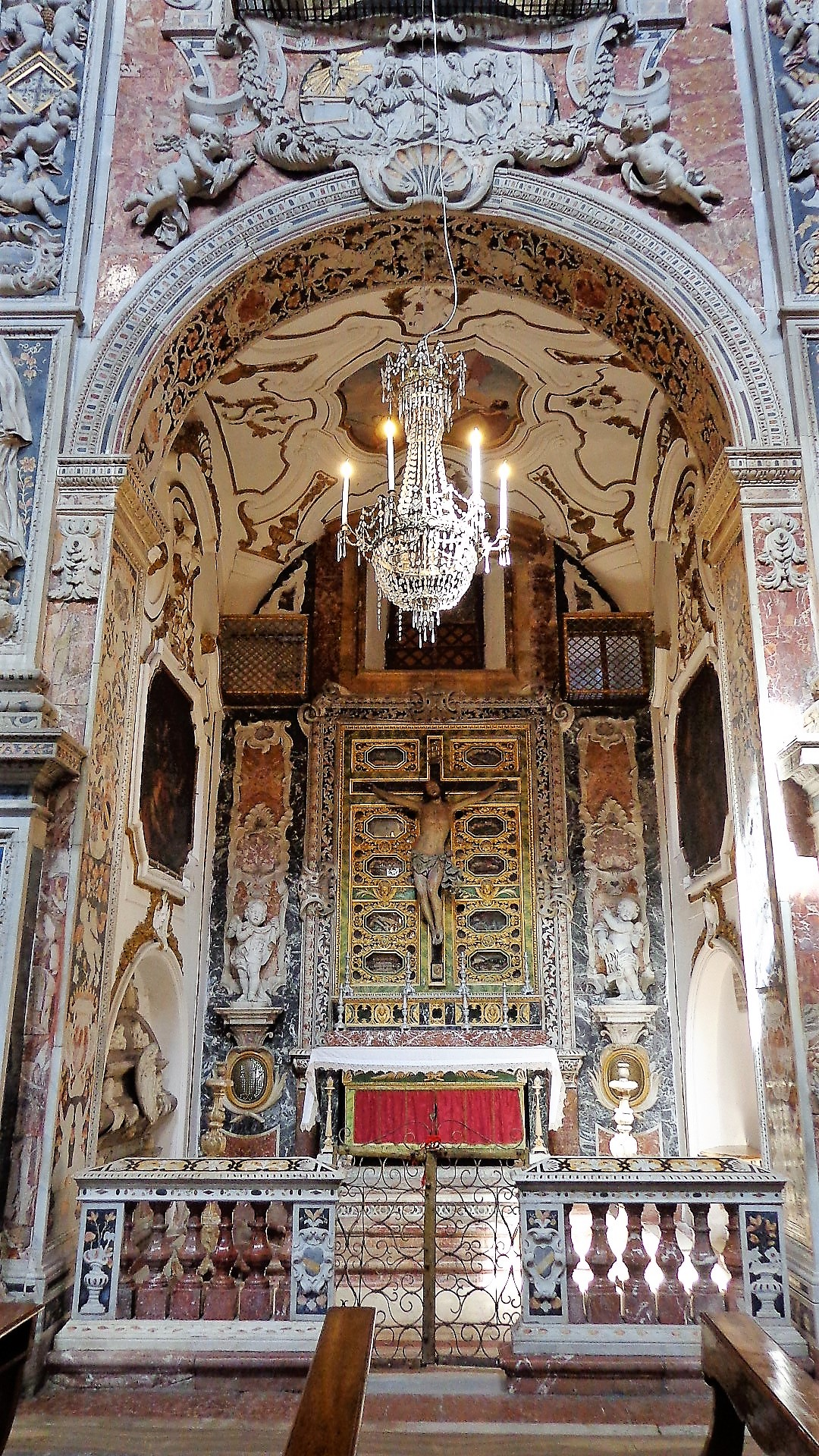
Chapel of the Crucifix

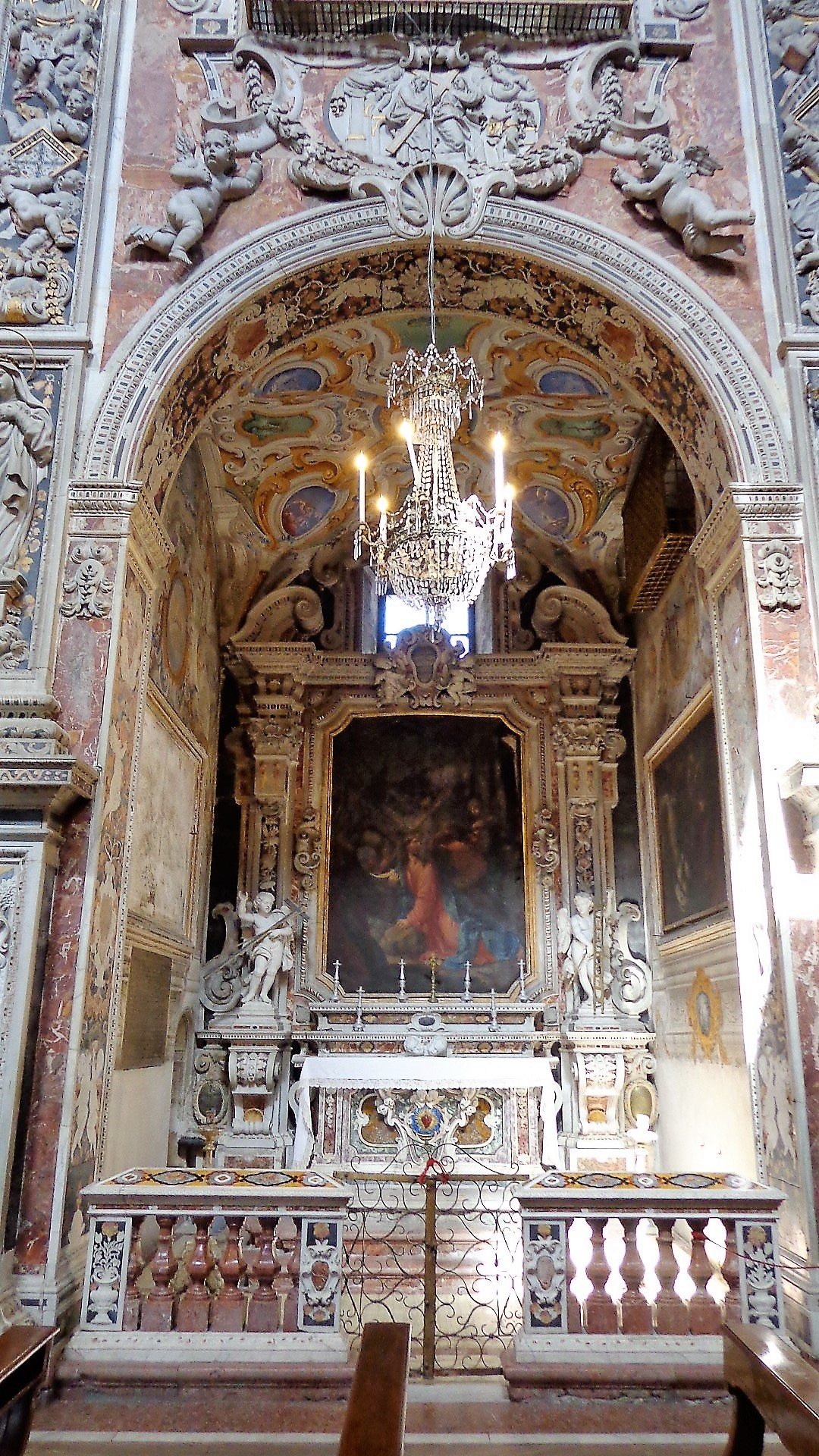
Chapel of the Carmine

The chapels along the left nave are:

- Capella dell'Immacolata Concezione – The main canvas altarpiece depicts the Marian devotional image of the Madonna of the Immaculate Conception. Additional canvases depict the Birth of the Virgin, a Adoration of the Shepherds, and Adoration of the Magi.
- Capella del Rosario – The main canvas altarpiece depicts the Madonna of Rosary before St Dominic flanked by statues of two Dominican saints Ludovico Bertran and Antoninus of Florence. Another canvas depicts Pope Pius V blesses Andrea Doria.
- Capella di San Domenico – The main canvas altarpiece depicts the St Dominic defeats the Heretics flanked canvases depict a Burning of Heretical books and a Madonna before Saints Francis and Dominic.
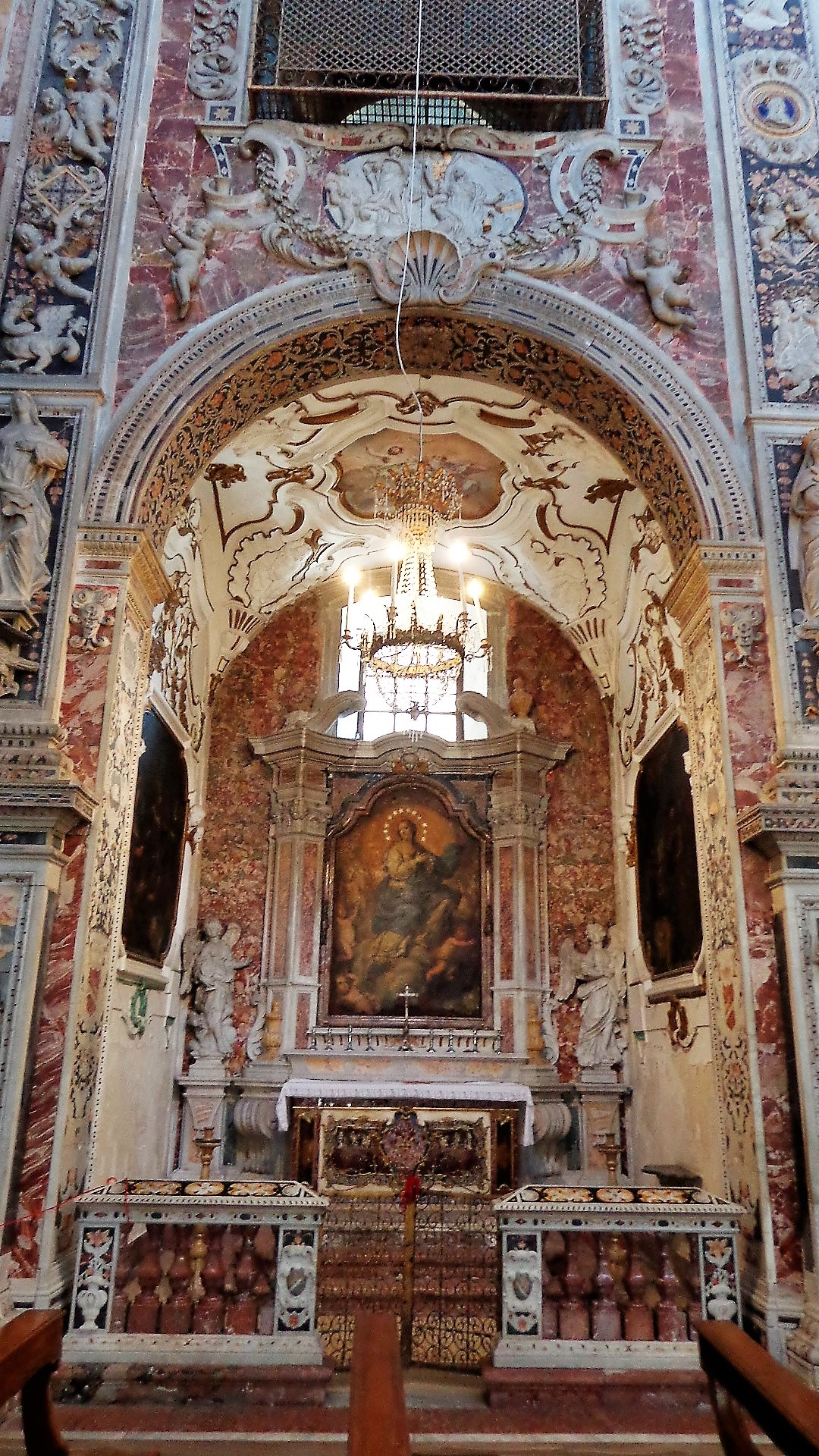
Chapel of Immaculate Conception

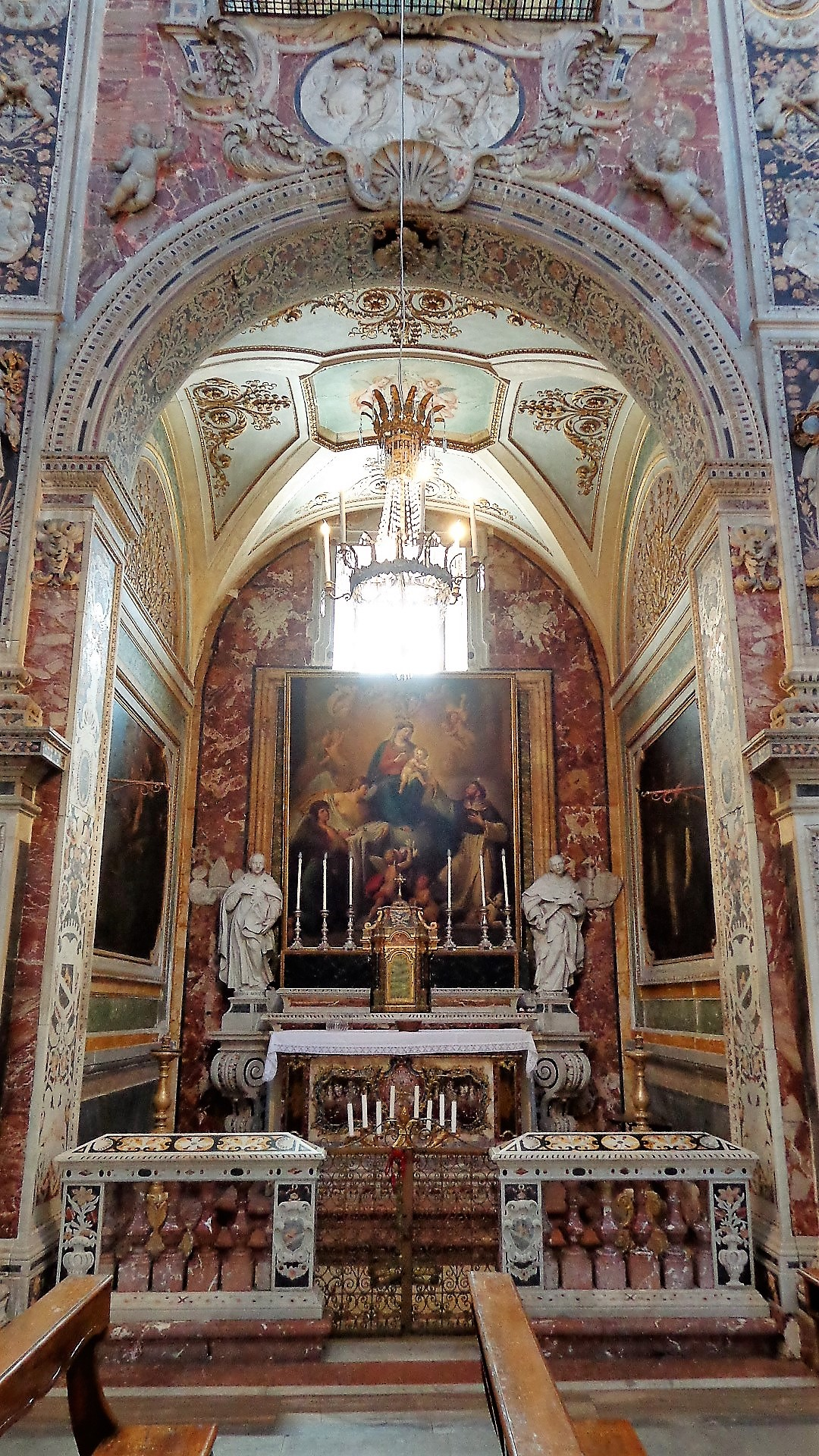
Chapel of the Rosary

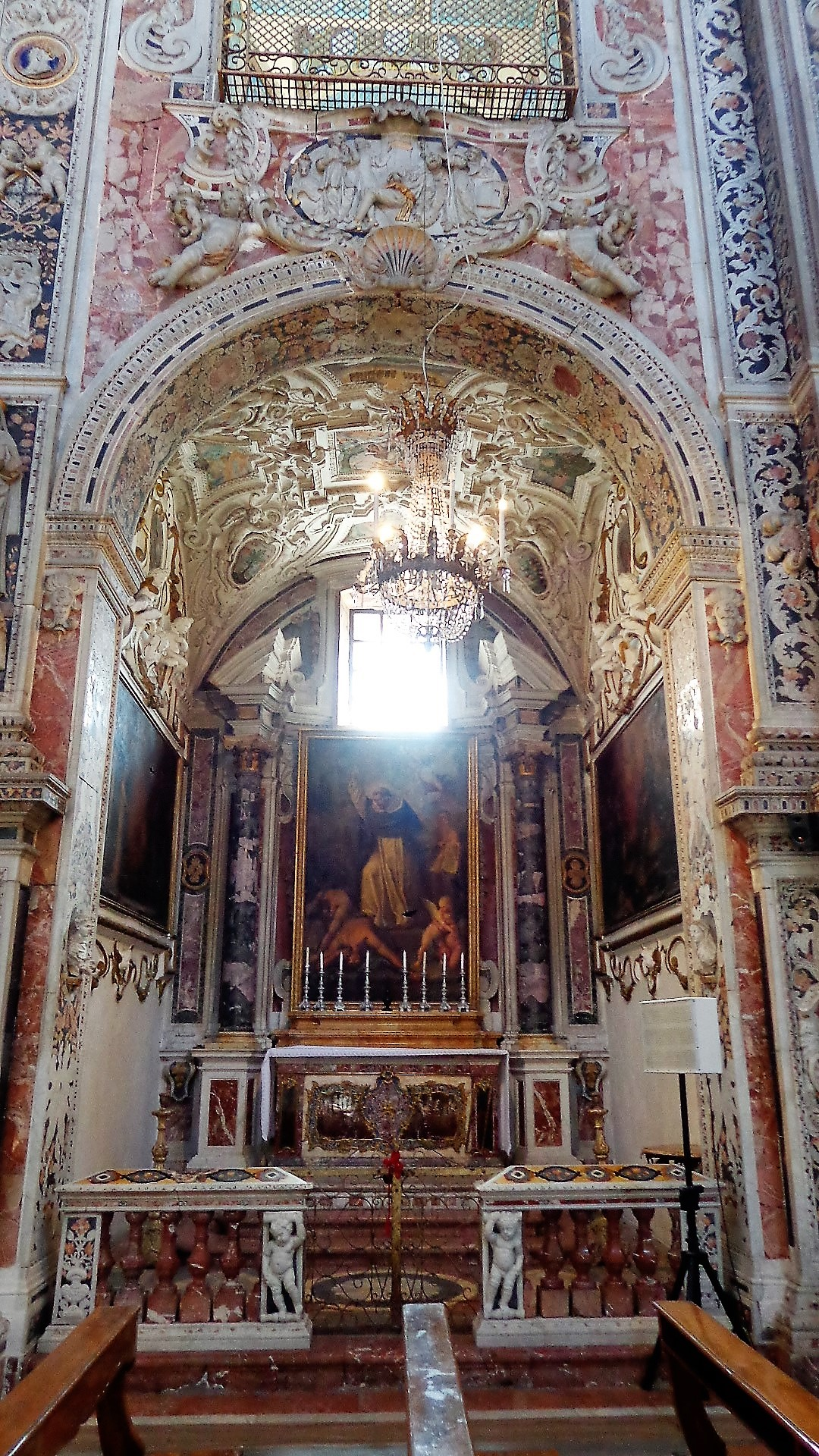
Chapel of St Dominic

The presbytery, or apse, has the main altar richly decorated with various pietre dure, including porphyry, thin columns of lapis lazuli, and has wooden angel statues covered with gold and silver. To right arm of the transept is a secondary altar with a central niche has a statue by Antonello Gagini, depicting a crowned Saint Catherine, holding a palm-leaf symbolising martyrdom and standing beside a wheel, the latter being the instrument used in her execution. The ensemble was ultimately designed by Andrea Palma and Giacomo Amato.

The dome was designed by Francesco Ferrigno and completed in 1750. By the next year, the interior had been frescoed by Vito D'Anna, depicting a Triumph of the Dominican Order, frescoes depicting allegories of the four continents (Africa (southeastern corner), America (southwestern corner), Asia (northwestern corner), and Europe (northeastern corner), throughout which, at the time, the order aimed to spread the Catholic faith. On pedestals protruding from the pilasters holding the dome, are four statues of Dominican saints sculpted by Giovanni Battista Ragusa: Dominic of Guzman, the founder of the order, holding a lily and, at his feet, a dog bearing a flaming torch to the globe; the scholar Thomas Aquinas with his scalp aflame; St Peter Martyr with the martyr's palm atop his scalp; and the apocalyptic preacher Vincent Ferrer with his hand over heart, gazing to heavens.

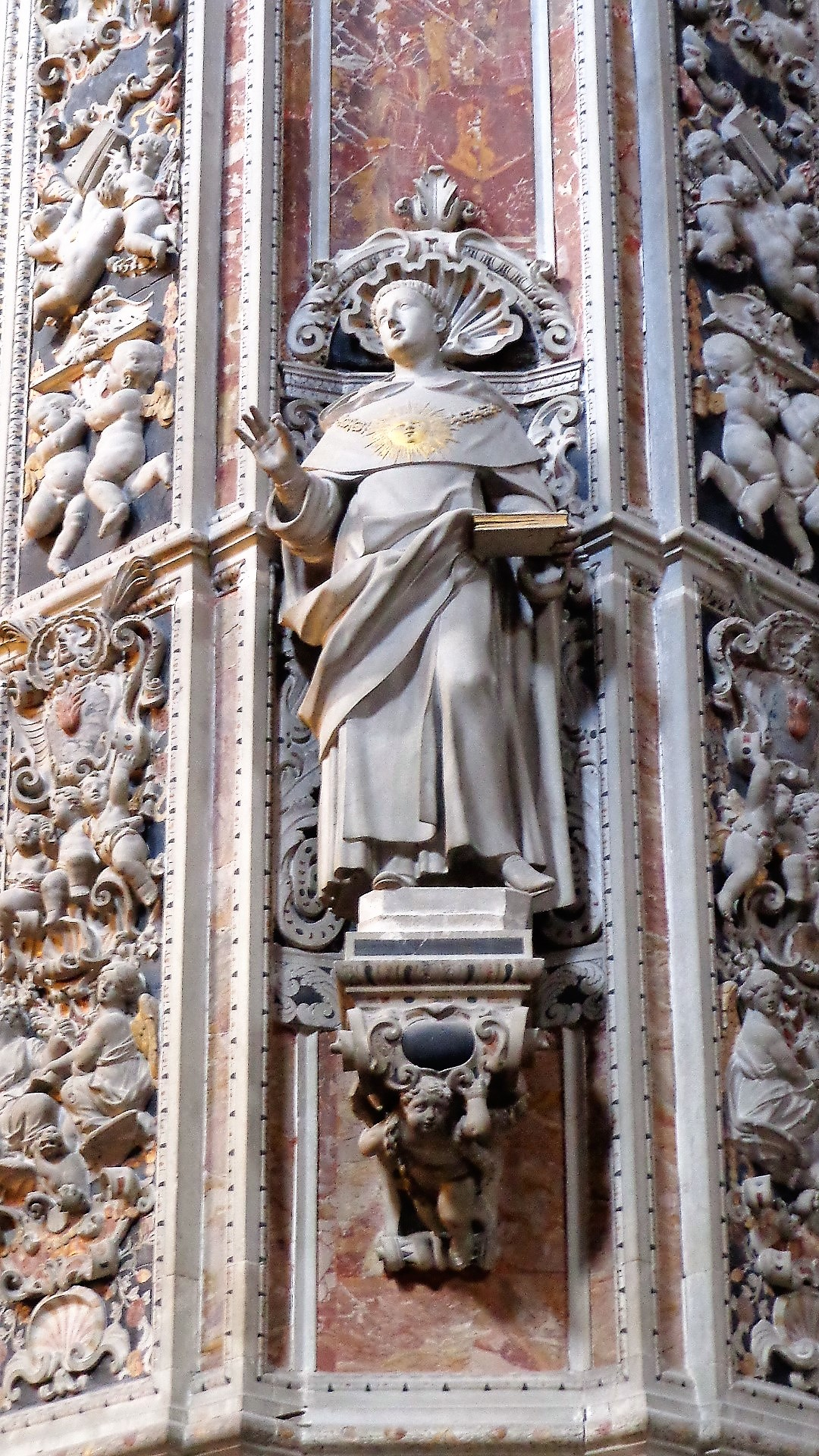
St Vincent Ferrer

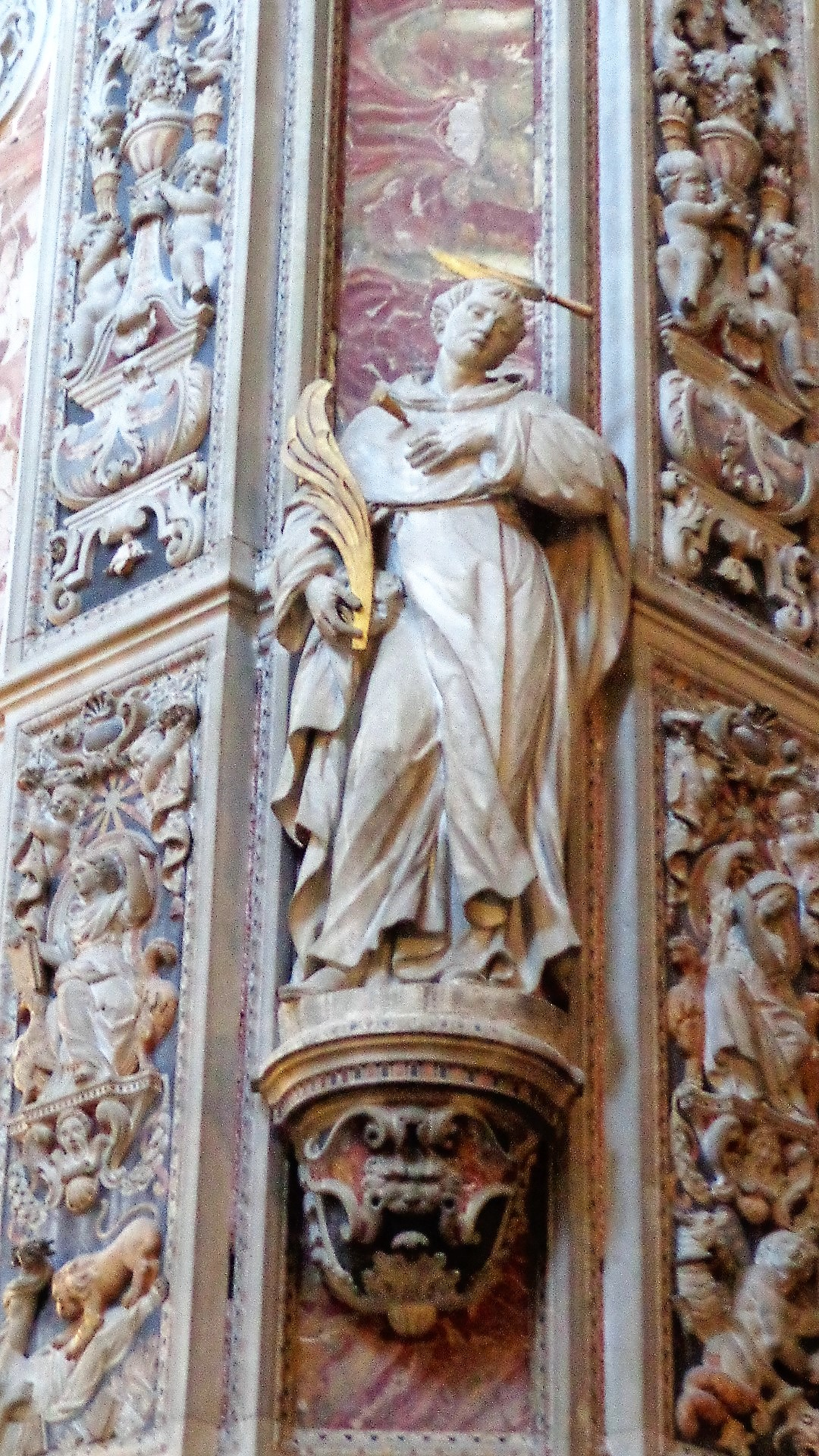
St Peter Martyr

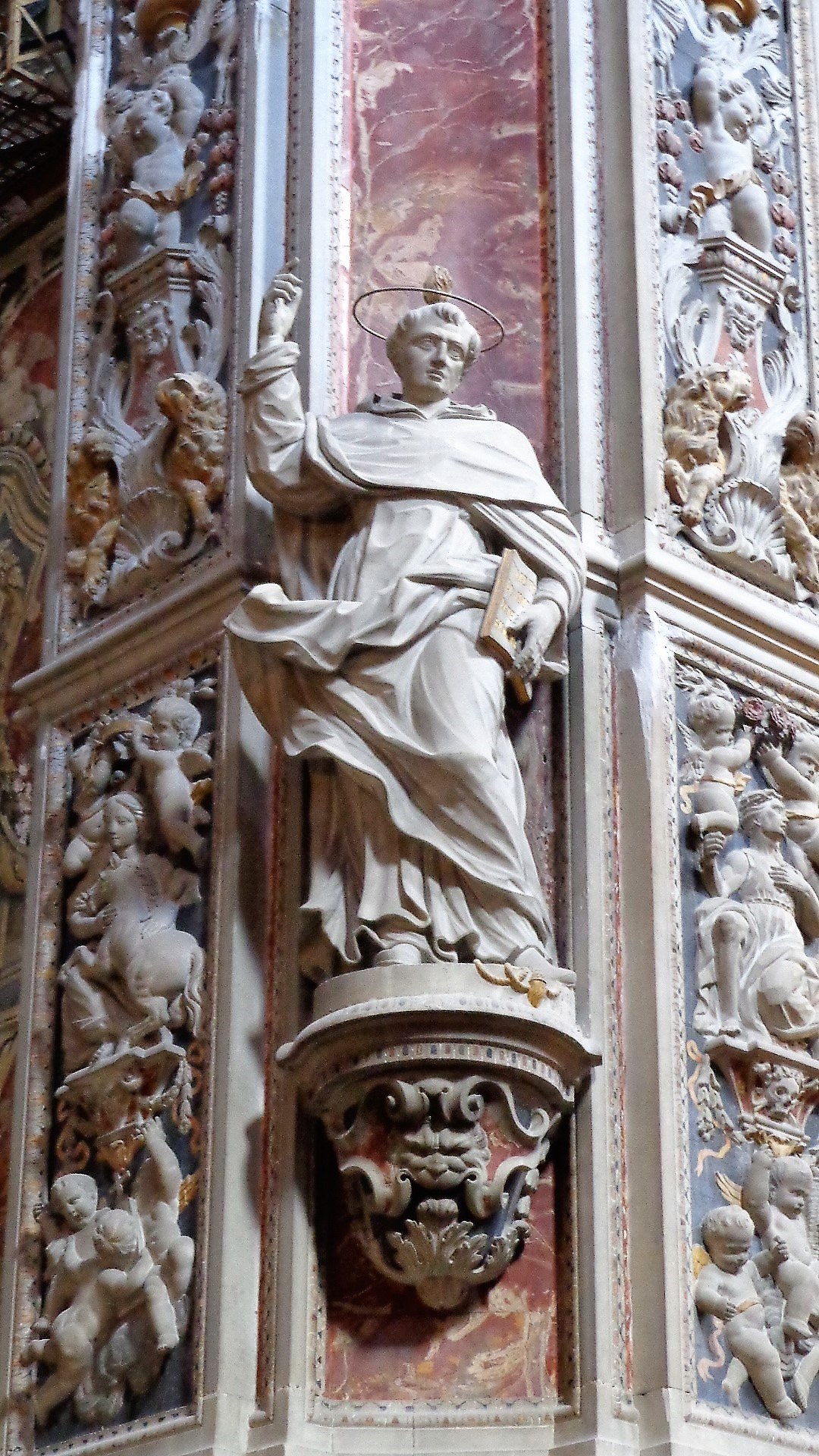
St Thomas Aquinas

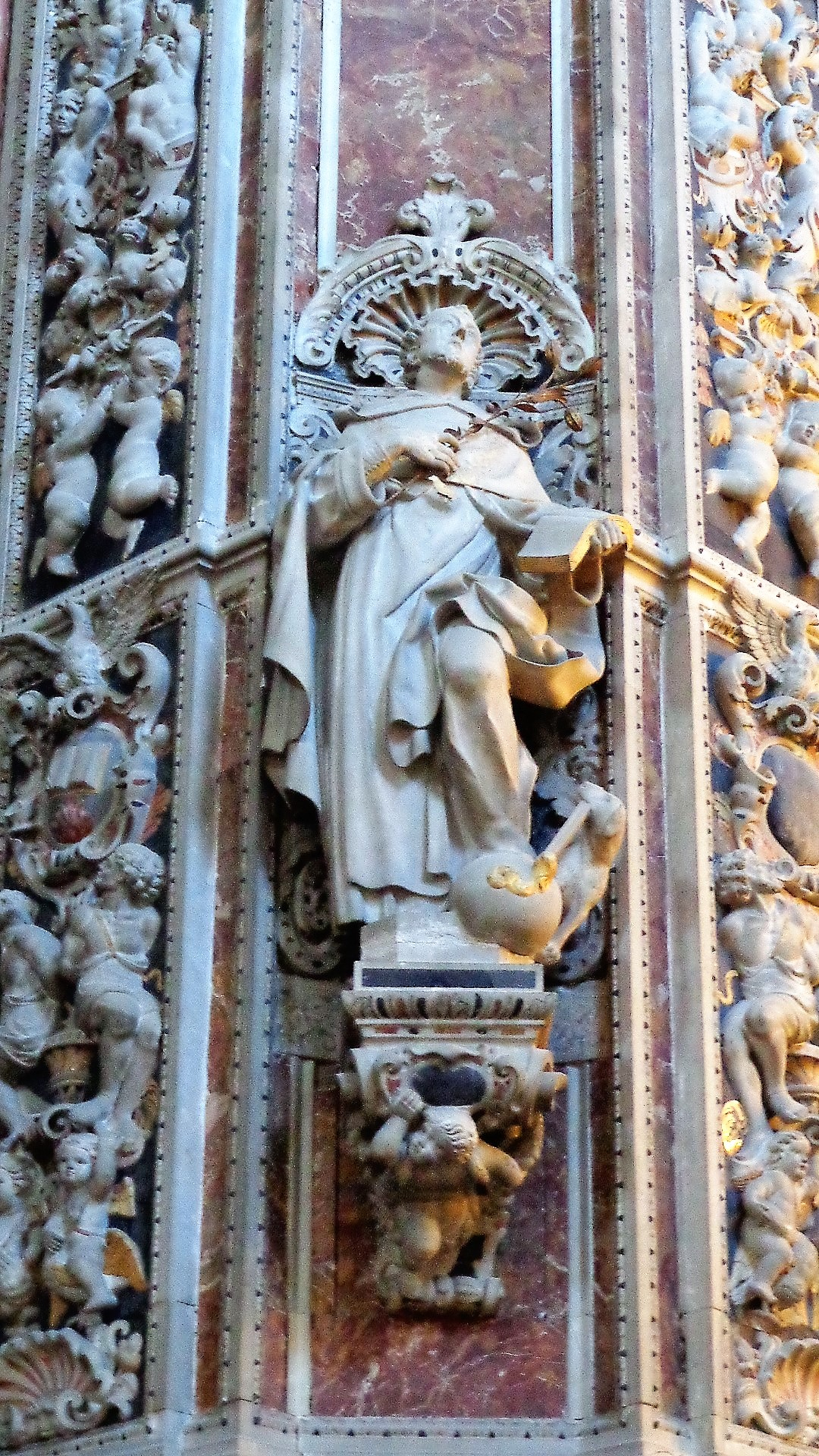
St Dominic

Frescoes:

- The Soul in glory rises to Heaven and Exaltation of the Eucharist by Antonio and Paolo Filocamo.

The church houses other precious artworks (statues, altars and frescoes) designed or made by artists such as Francesco Sozzi, Alessandro D'Anna, and Ignazio Marabitti.

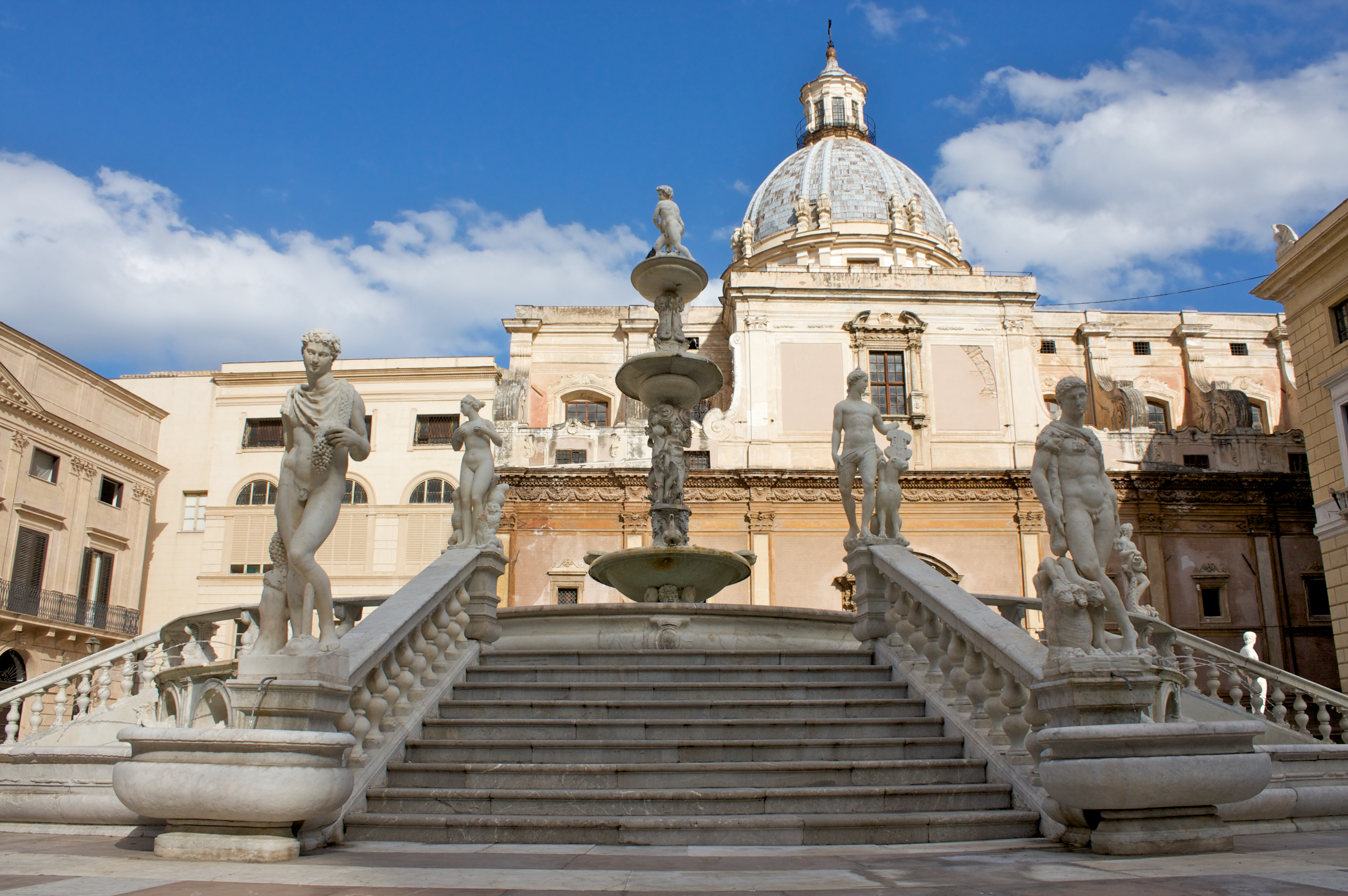
The dome and the Fontana Pretoria

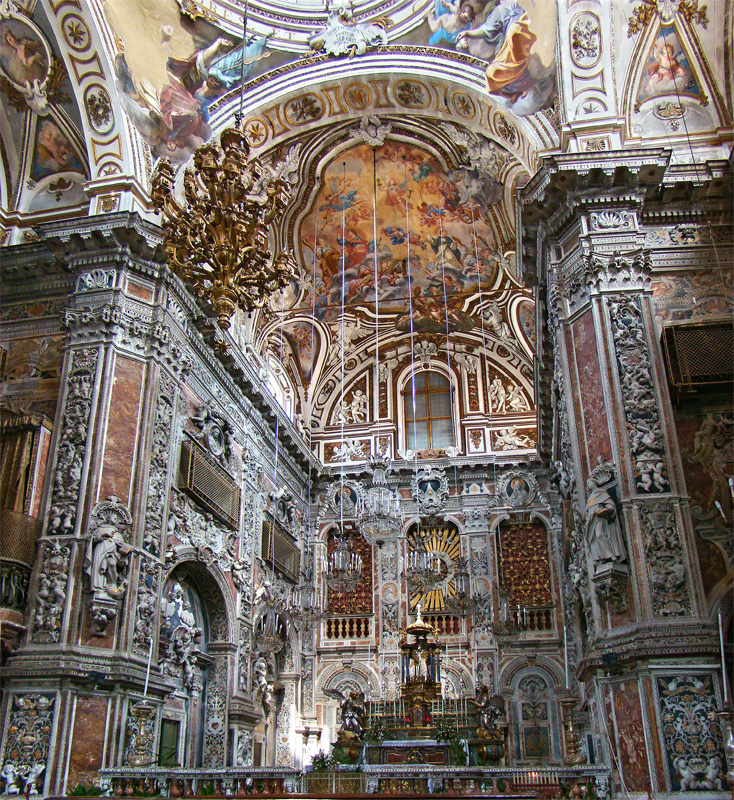
Chancel: at the top the fresco The Soul in glory rises to Heaven, by Antonio Filocamo and Paolo Filocamo
