= Piazza Pretoria =

Piazza in Palermo, Italy

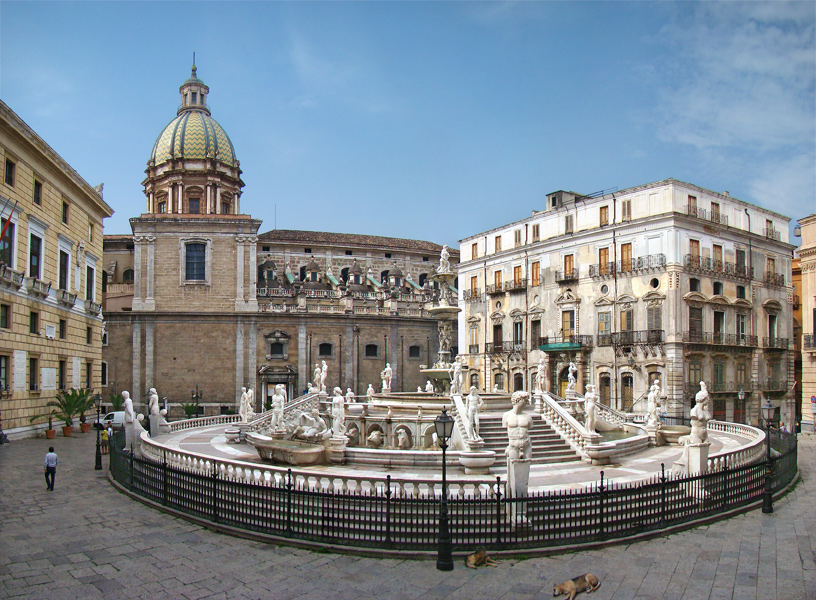
- View of the square from Santa Caterina
- Location: Palermo, Sicily, Italy
- Coordinates: 38°06′56″N 13°21′43″E

Piazza Pretoria is at the limits of the district of Kalsa, near the corner of Cassaro with Via Maqueda, just a few meters from the Quattro Canti, the intersection where all the four ancient quarters intersect, in the city of Palermo, region of Sicily, Italy.

== History ==
At the center of the square is the Fontana Pretoria; this fountain had originally been designed in 1554 by Francesco Camilliani for the Palace of San Clemente in Florence. The Senate of Palermo, in 1573, seeking to embellish this city with a grandiose monument purchased the fountain, and transported here.

The large fountain was meant for a large open space, and required several homes in this area to be demolished. The fountain was re-adapted to the site with the addition of new parts. By 1581, the fountain had been installed in this square, sporting sixteen nude statues of nymphs, humans, mermaids and satyrs. The fountain has not always been admired. Since the 18th-century, due to the prolific nudity, some called this the Fontana della Vergogna (Fountain of Shame).

== Description ==
Three of the four sides are enclosed by buildings: the Praetorian Palace (the town hall) built in fourteenth century and renovated in nineteenth century; the Church of St. Catherine (end of sixteenth century); and two baronial palaces, Palazzo Bonocore and Palazzo Bordonaro. On the fourth side of the square a staircase, flanked by two lions made with gray marble from Bilimbi, sculpted by Domenico Costantino and installed in 1877, descends to Via Maqueda.
