= Church of San Cataldo =

Catholic church in Palermo, Sicily, Italy

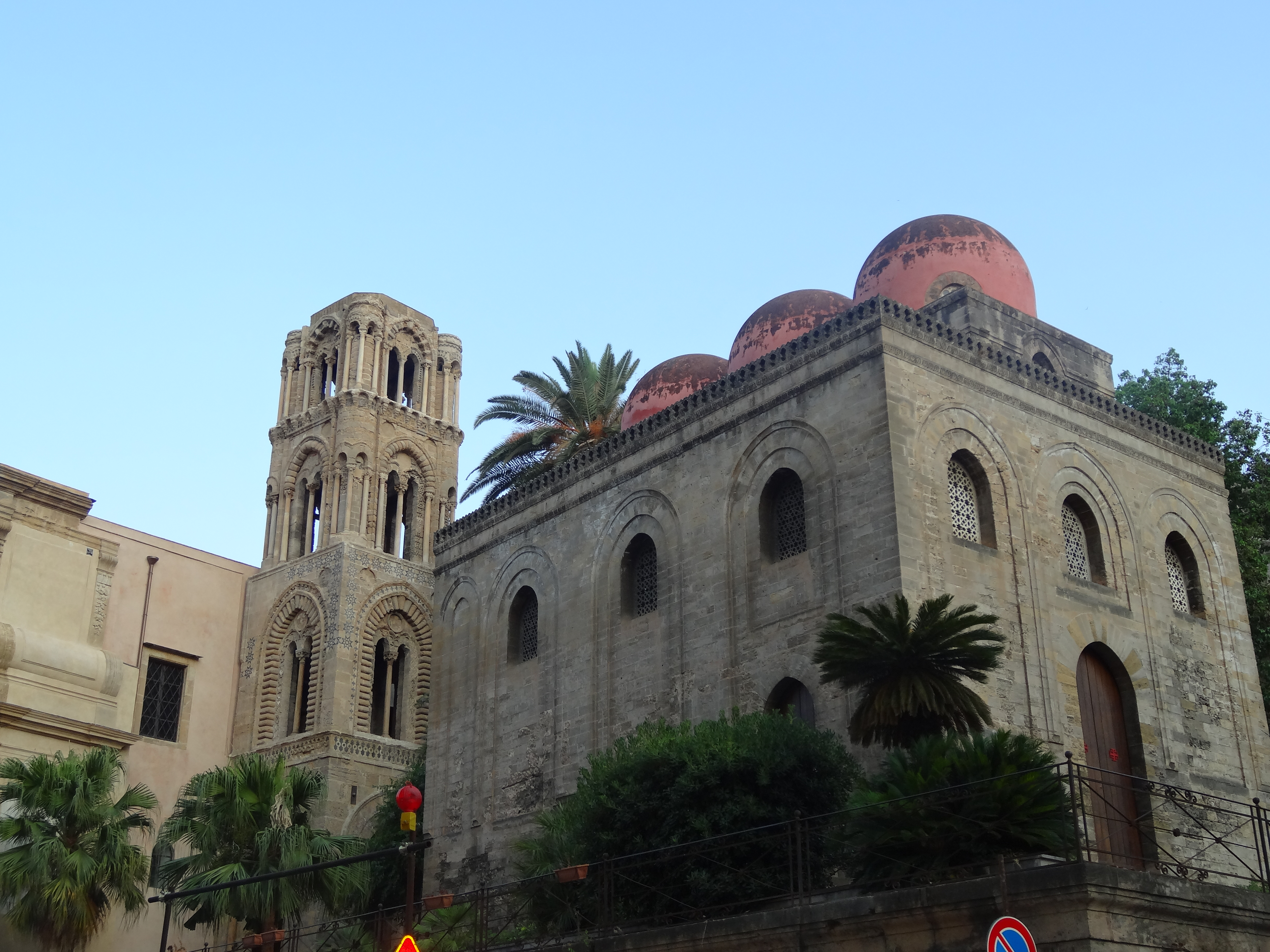
- San Cataldo, Palermo, with its typical red domes

Religion
- Affiliation: Catholic Church
- Province: Knights of the Holy Sepulchre

Location
- Location: Piazza Bellini 3, Kalsa, Palermo, 90133
- Interactive map of Church of San Cataldo
- Coordinates: 38.1148°N 13.3625°E

Architecture
- Type: Church
- Style: Romanesque
- Completed: 1154
- UNESCO World Heritage Site
- Official name: Arab-Norman Palermo and the Cathedral Churches of Cefalù and Monreale
- Type: Cultural
- Criteria: ii, iv
- Designated: 2015 (39th session)
- Reference no.: 1487
- State Party: Italy
- Region: Europe and North America

The Church of San Cataldo (or Saint Cathal's Church) is a Catholic church located at Piazza Bellini, in central Palermo, Sicily, Italy. Erected in 1154 as a notable example of the Arab-Norman architecture which flourished in Sicily under Norman rule on the island, the church is annexed to that of Santa Maria dell'Ammiraglio. Since the 1930s, it belongs to the Order of the Holy Sepulchre.

In 2015, it received status as a World Heritage Site.

== History and overview ==
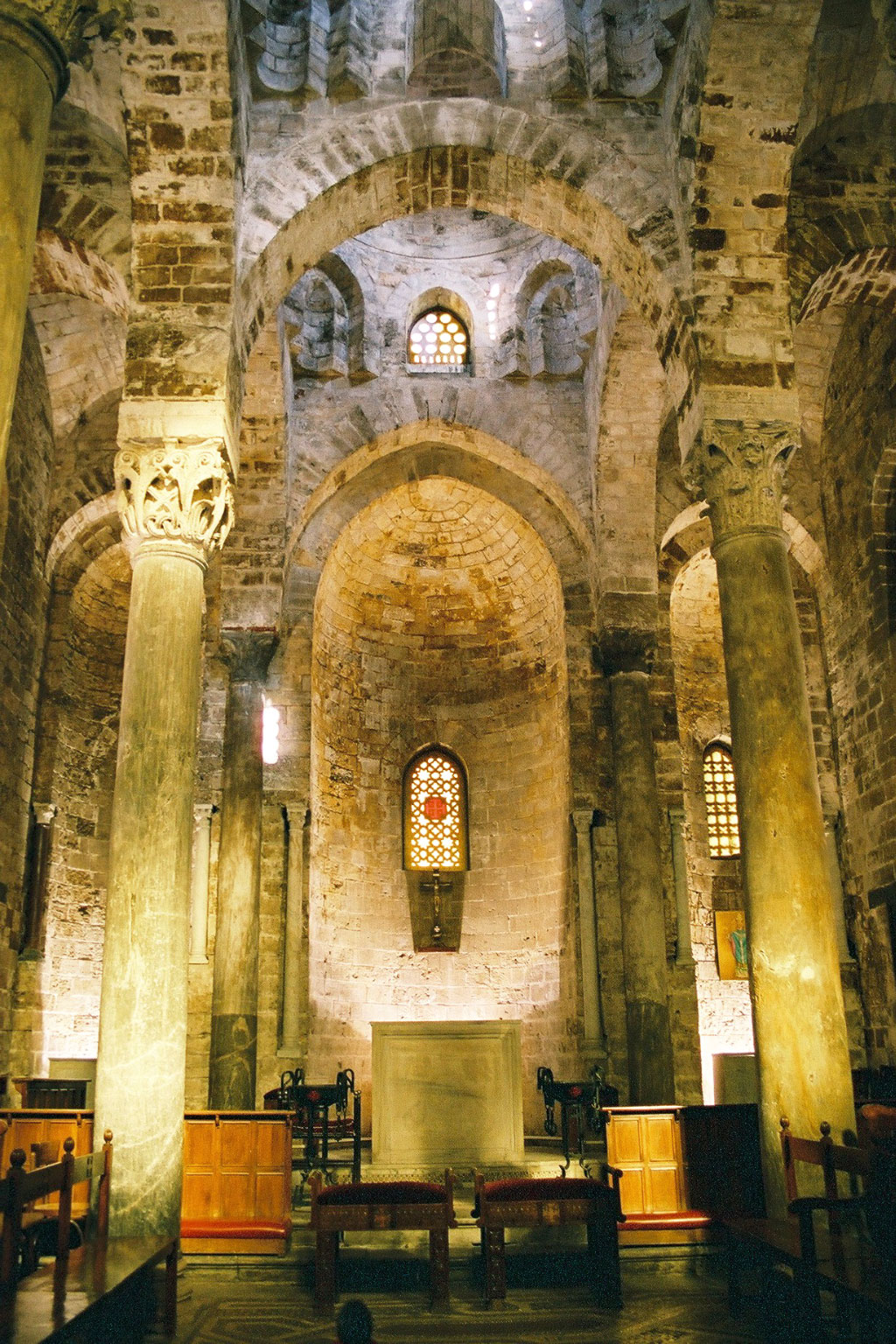
Interior view

Founded around 1160 by admiral Majone di Bari, in the 18th century the church was used as a post office. In the 19th century it was restored and brought back to a form more similar to the original Mediaeval edifice.

It has a rectangular plan with blind arches, partially occupied by windows. The ceiling has three characteristics red, bulge domes (cubole) and Arab-style merlons. The church provides a typical example of the Arab-Norman architecture, which is unique to Sicily. The plan of the church shows the predilection of the Normans for simple and severe forms, derived from their military formation. Moreover, the building shows how international the language of Norman architecture was at the time, as the vocabulary which marks parts of the church, like the bell tower, can be tracked down in coeval buildings like the cathedral of Laon and the Abbaye aux Dames in Caen, both in Northern France, or the cathedral of Durham in England. At the same time, the church shows features shared by Islamic and Byzantine architecture, such as the preference for cubic forms, the blind arches which articulate the external walls of the church, and the typical spherical red domes on the roof.

The interior has a nave with two aisles. The naked walls are faced by spolia columns with Byzantine style arcades. The pavement is the original one and has a splendid mosaic decoration. Also original is the main altar.

The old City Wall can be seen running underneath the Church.

== See also ==
- Catald, Irish monk and saint
- Arab-Norman Palermo and the Cathedral Churches of Cefalù and Monreale
- High medieval domes
