= Camilliani =

Camilliani is an Italian-language surname. Notable people with the surname include:

- Camillo Camilliani (fl. 1574–1603), Italian architect, military engineer and sculptor, the son
- Francesco Camilliani (1530–1586), Tuscan sculptor, the father
