= Fontana Pretoria =

Monumental fountain in Palermo, Italy

Praetorian Fountain
- Fontana Pretoria (Italian)
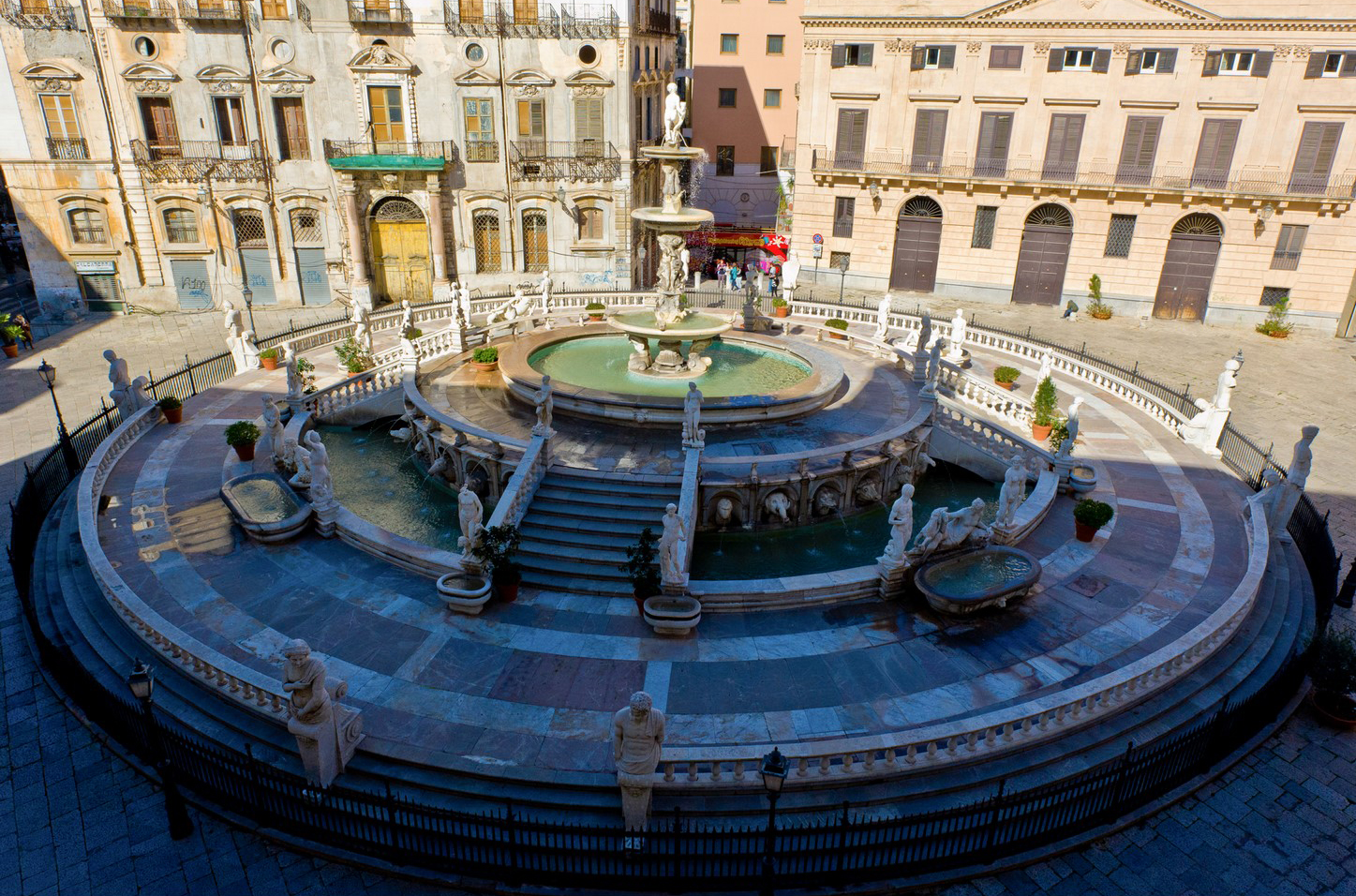
- View of the fountain from Palazzo Pretorio
- Artist: Francesco Camilliani
- Year: 1554
- Type: Public fountain
- Medium: Marble
- Location: Palermo, Italy; 38°06′55.75″N 13°21′43.5″E

The Praetorian Fountain (Italian: Fontana Pretoria) is a monumental fountain located in Piazza Pretoria in the historic center of Palermo, region of Sicily, Italy. The fountain dominates the piazza on the west flank of the church of Santa Caterina, and is one block south of the intersection of the Quattro Canti. The fountain was originally built in 1544 in Florence by Francesco Camilliani, but was sold, transferred, and reassembled in Palermo in 1574.

== History ==
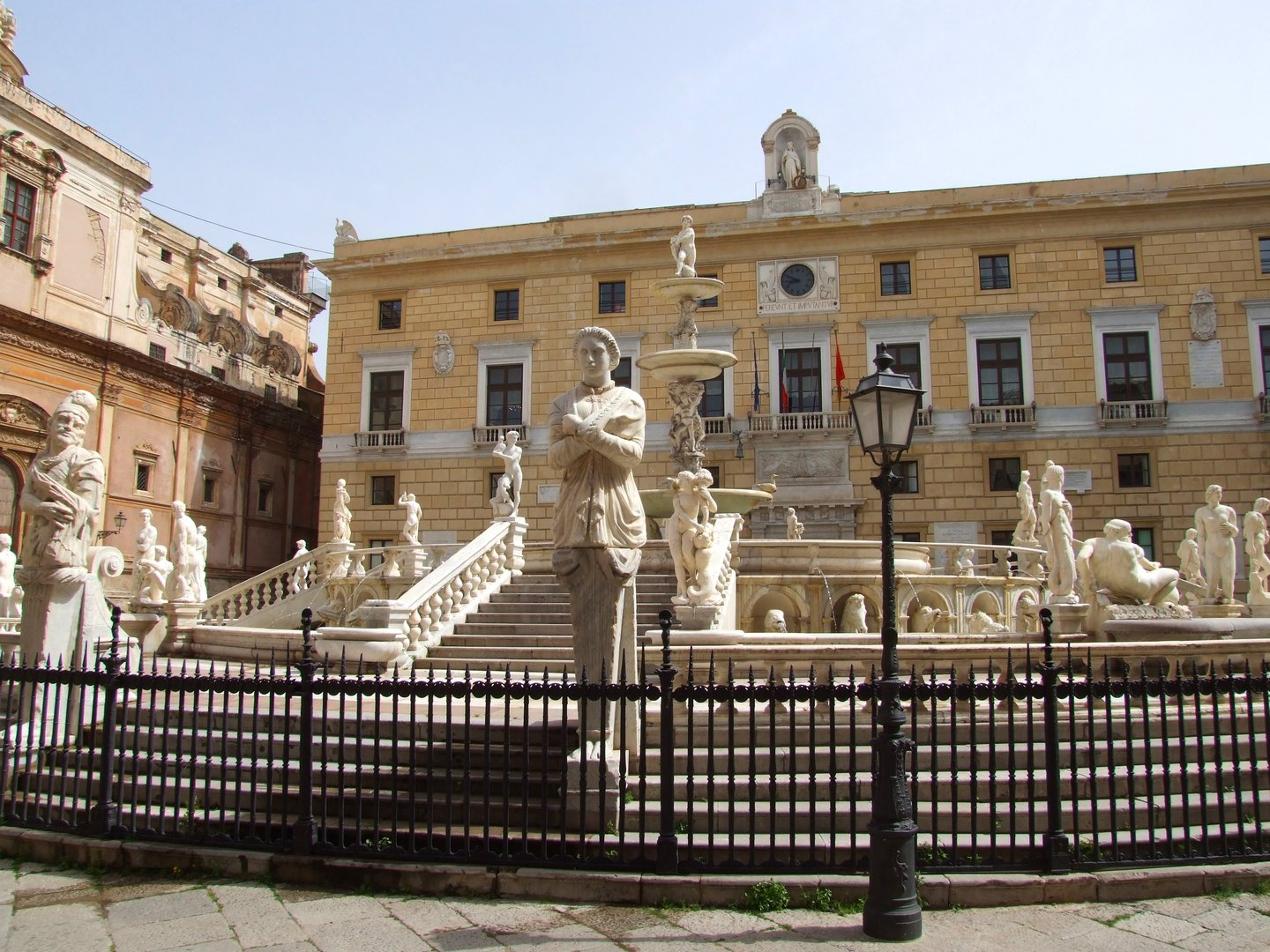
The fountain with Palazzo Pretorio in the background

=== Florentine origin ===
The fountain was created for the garden of don Luigi de Toledo in Florence. Previously the plot of this garden in Florence belonged to the nuns of San Domenico al Maglio and, after a lot of pressure, was obtained in 1551. Subsequently, in 1584, the Palazzo di San Clemente was built near this site. The creation of this unusual garden (devoid of palaces) and of the fountain was commissioned to the Florentine sculptor Francesco Camilliani, student of Baccio Bandinelli.

The work was started in 1554. The fountain included 48 statues and was surrounded by a long arbor formed by 90 columns of wood designed by Bartolomeo Ammannati. Giorgio Vasari called the fountain: «stupendissima (...) che non ha pari in Fiorenza nè forse in Italia» («most wonderful (...) unparalleled in Florence and maybe in Italy»).

=== Relocation to Palermo ===
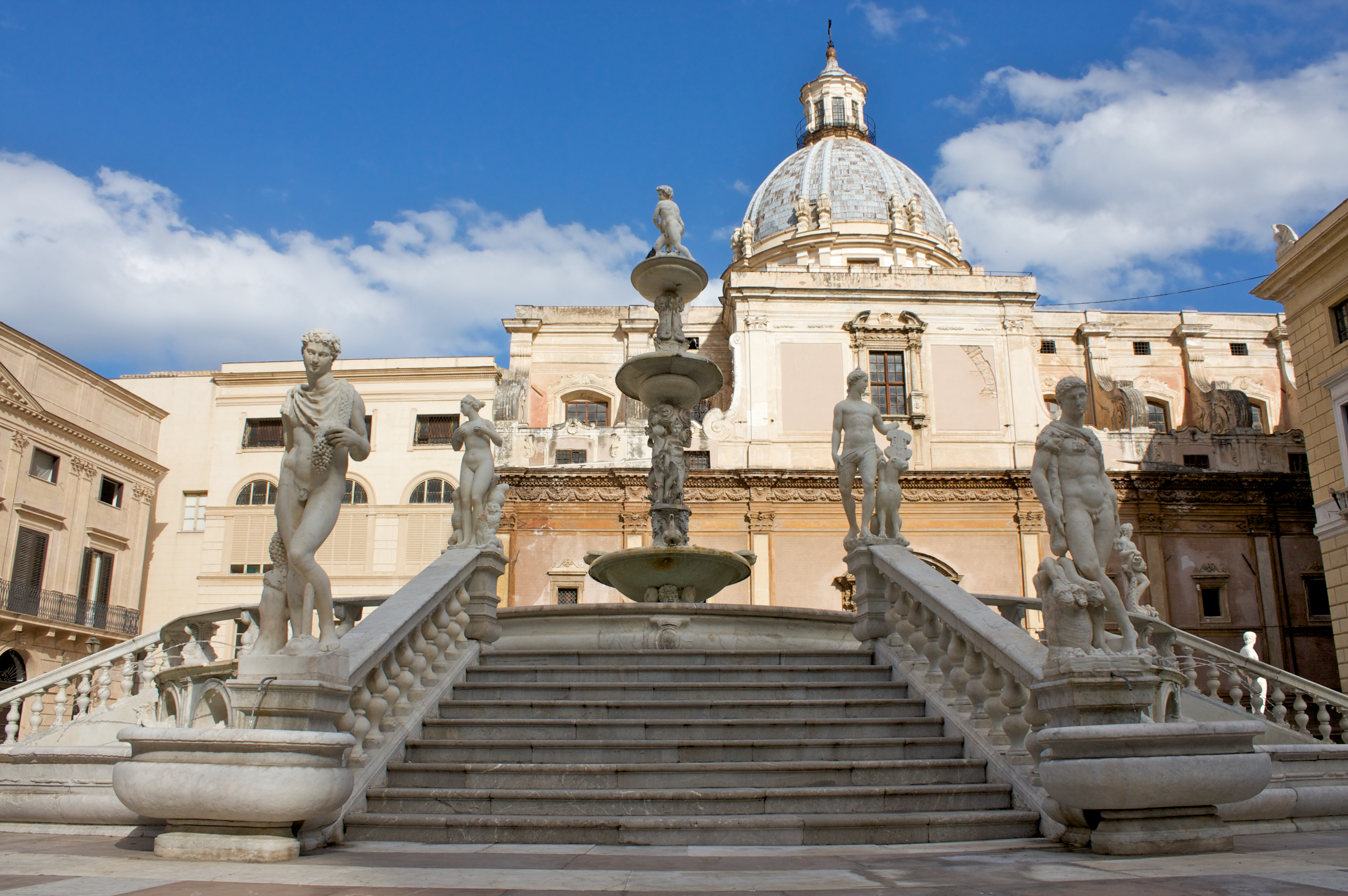
The fountain with the dome of Santa Caterina in the background

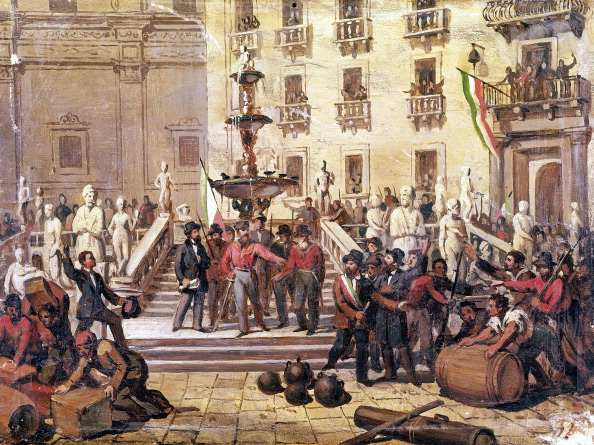
Expedition of the Thousand, 1860, by Giuseppe Garibaldi, in Piazza Pretoria

In 1573 the owner of the fountain was Luigi de Toledo (brother of the former Viceroy of Sicily García de Toledo); Luigi had fallen deep in dept, and on the verge of moving to Naples, sold the fountain to the city of Palermo. In fact, the Senate of Palermo decided to buy the building in front of the square and relocated here the city hall, called Palazzo Pretorio.

On 26 May 1574 the fountain arrived in Palermo. In order to transport it, the fountain was disassembled in 644 pieces. Then, in order to make room for the fountain, several buildings were demolished. However, the fountain arrived incomplete in Palermo. Some sculptures were damaged during the transport, others were maybe kept by Luigi de Toledo (probably the statues of two Divinities preserved in the Bargello Museum of Florence and other statues placed in Naples and then in the garden of Abadia, in the Spanish city of Cáceres).

Therefore, in Palermo, adjustment were made. The work was assembled by Camillo Camilliani, son of Francesco Camilliani. In 1581, Camillo completed the work with the help of Michelangelo Naccherino.

Between 18th century and 19th century, the fountain was considered a sort of depiction of the corrupt municipality of Palermo. For this reason and because of the nudity of the statues, the square became known as "Piazza della Vergogna" (Square of Shame). In 1998 the restoration of the fountain started. It was completed in 2003.

== Description ==
The fountain represents the twelve Olympians, other mythological figures, animals and the rivers of Palermo.

== Cultural references ==
In 1973, Italian National Postal Service dedicated a postage stamp to the Fontana Pretoria.

The fountain and Piazza Pretoria appear in the music video for the song "Diva" by the Italian music group La Rappresentante di Lista.

== Gallery ==
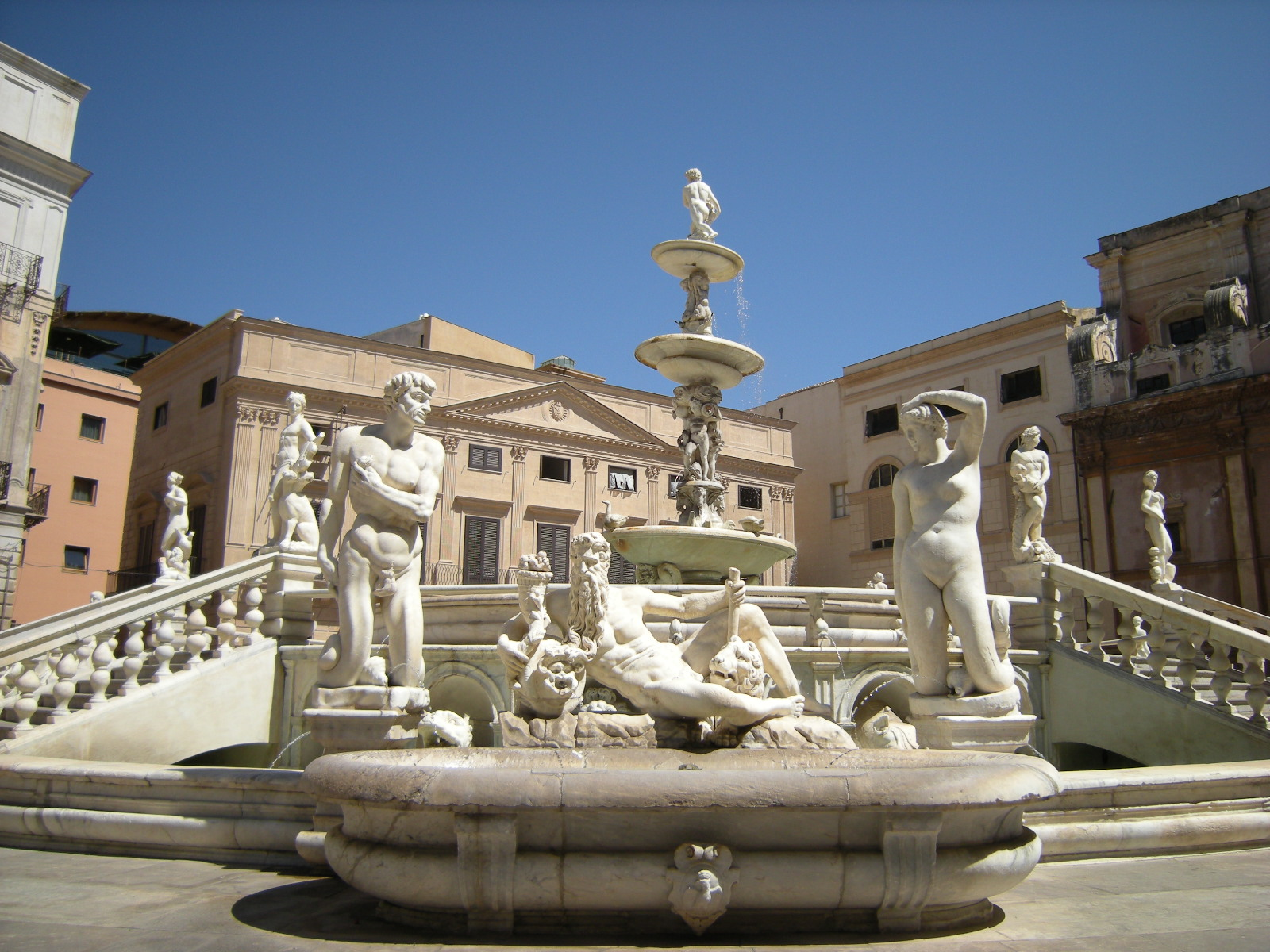

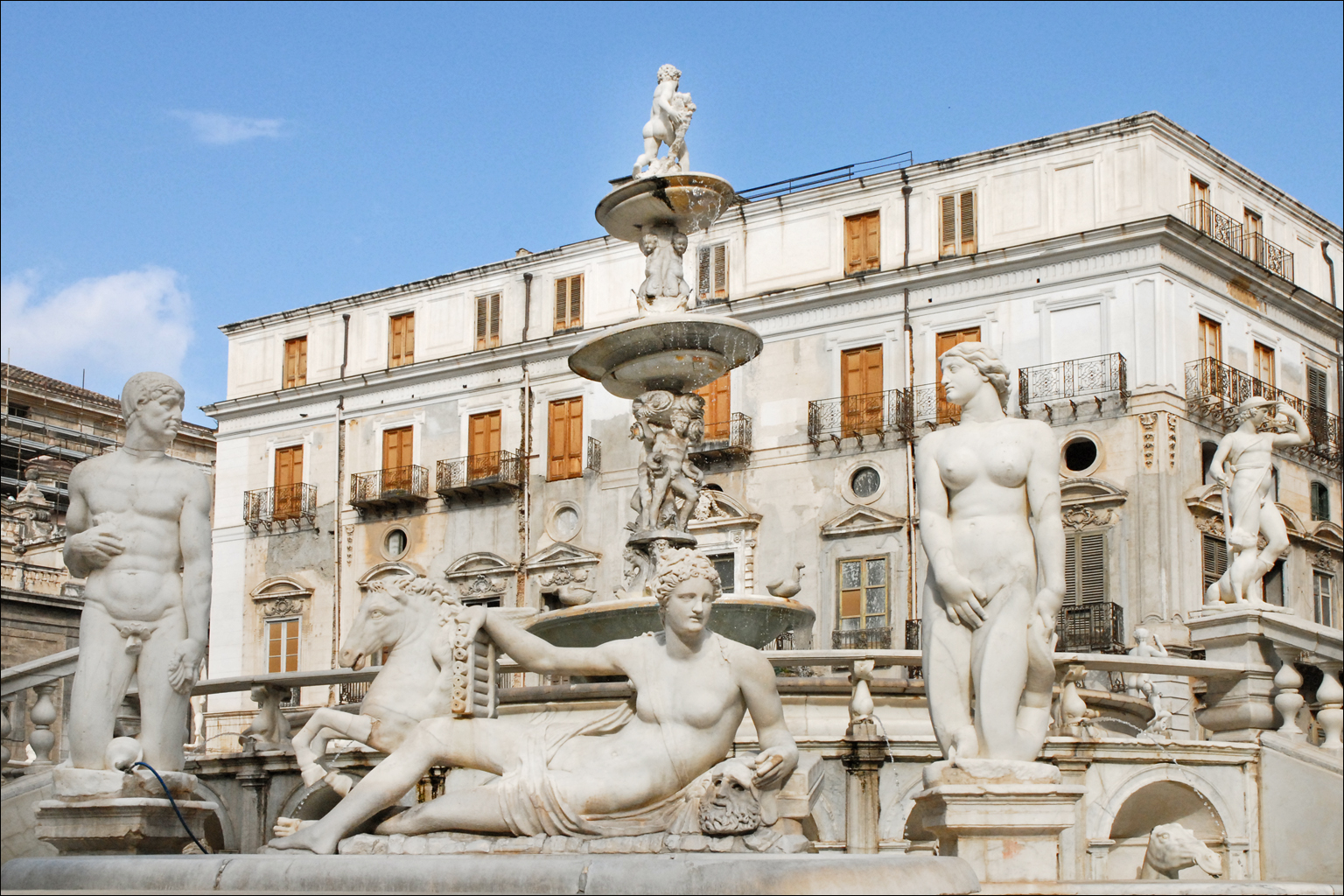

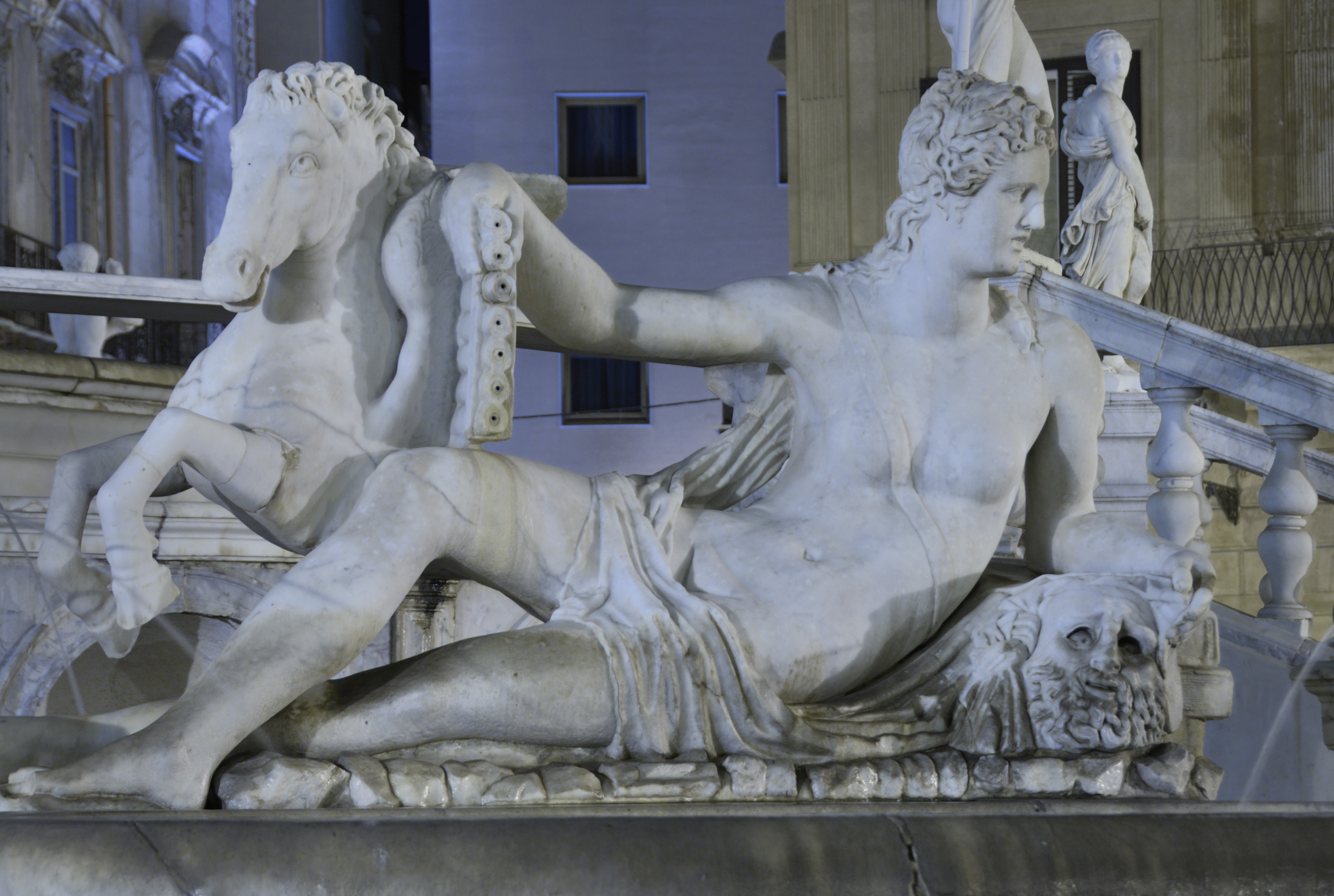

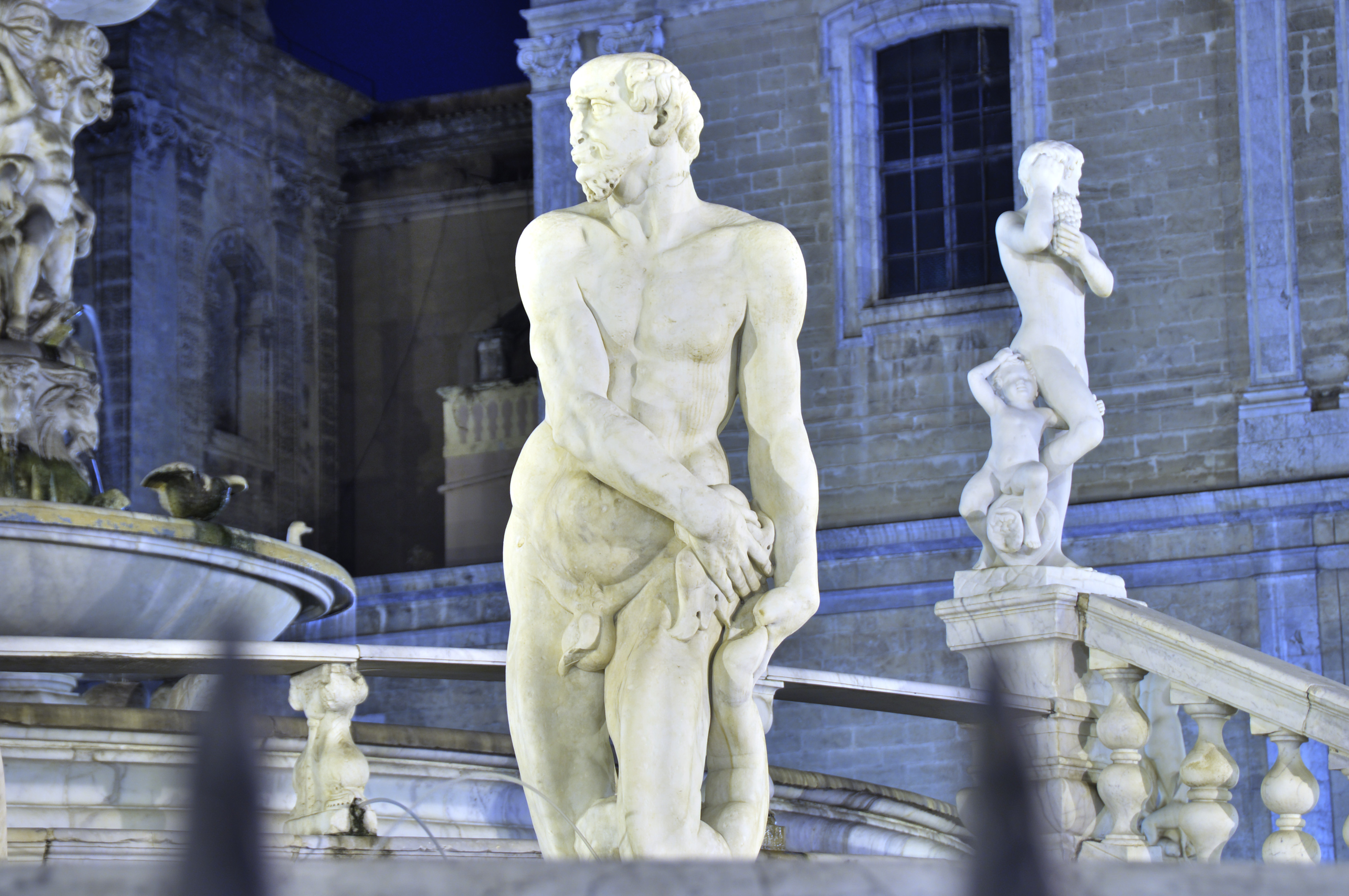

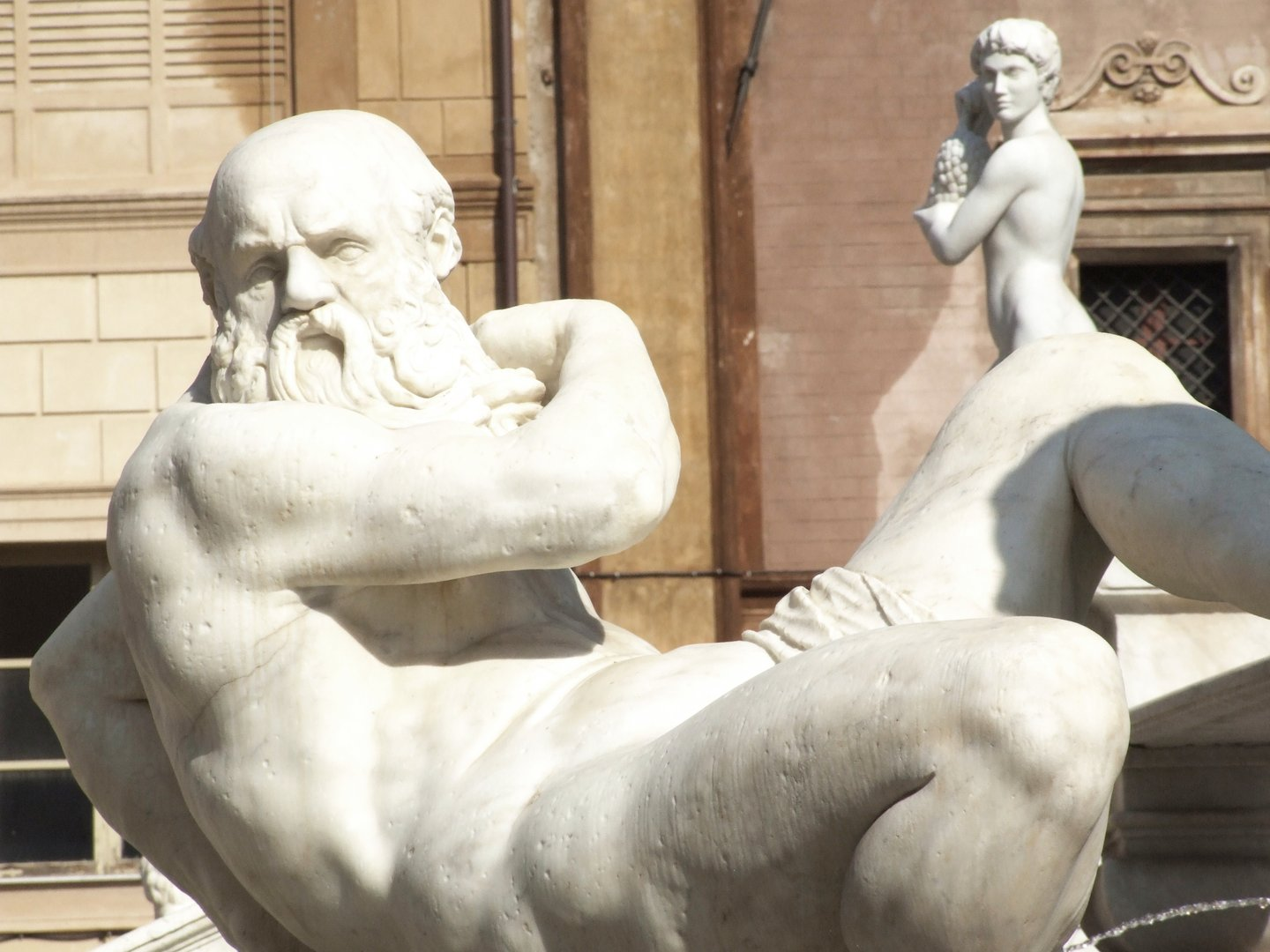

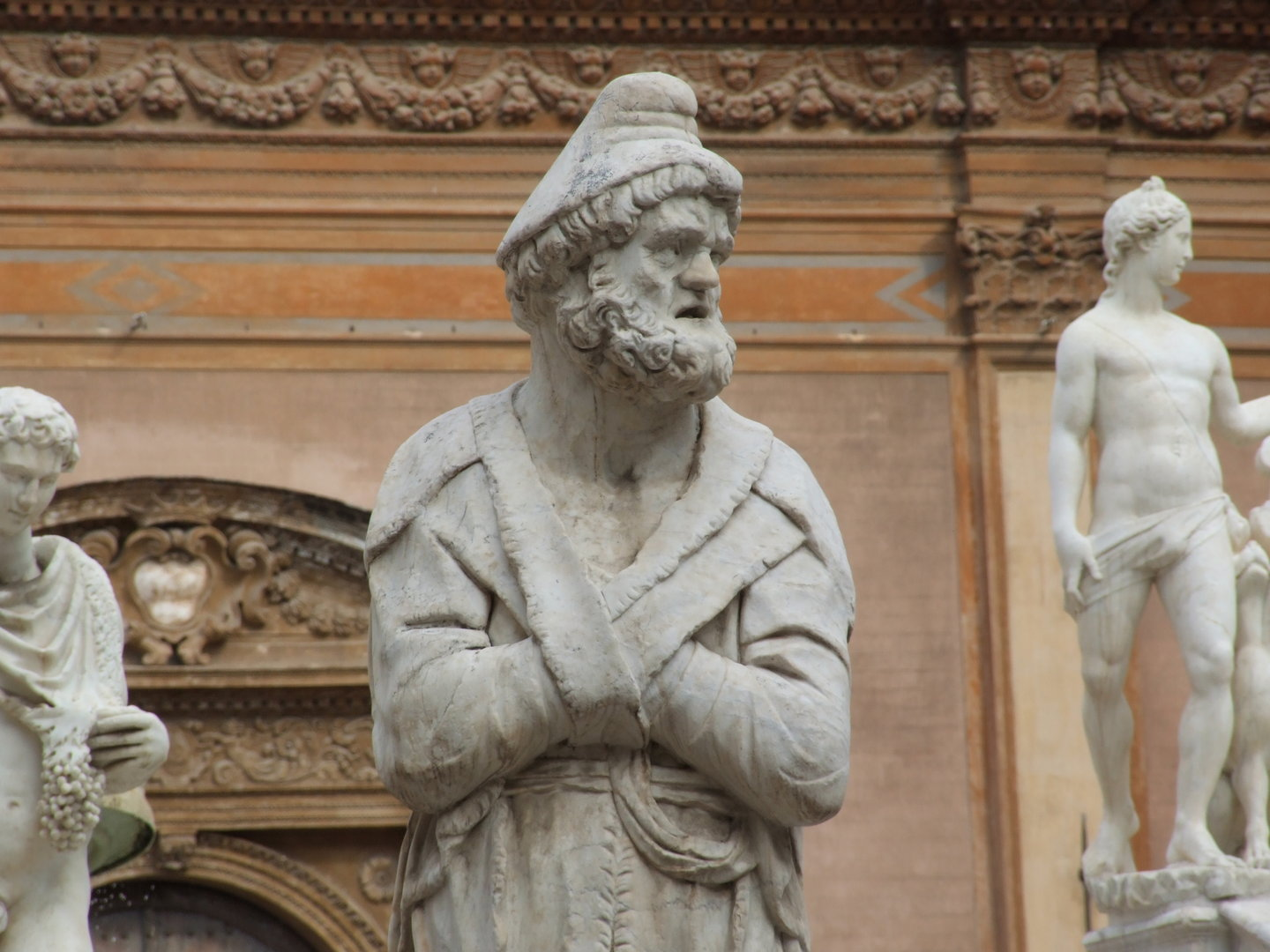

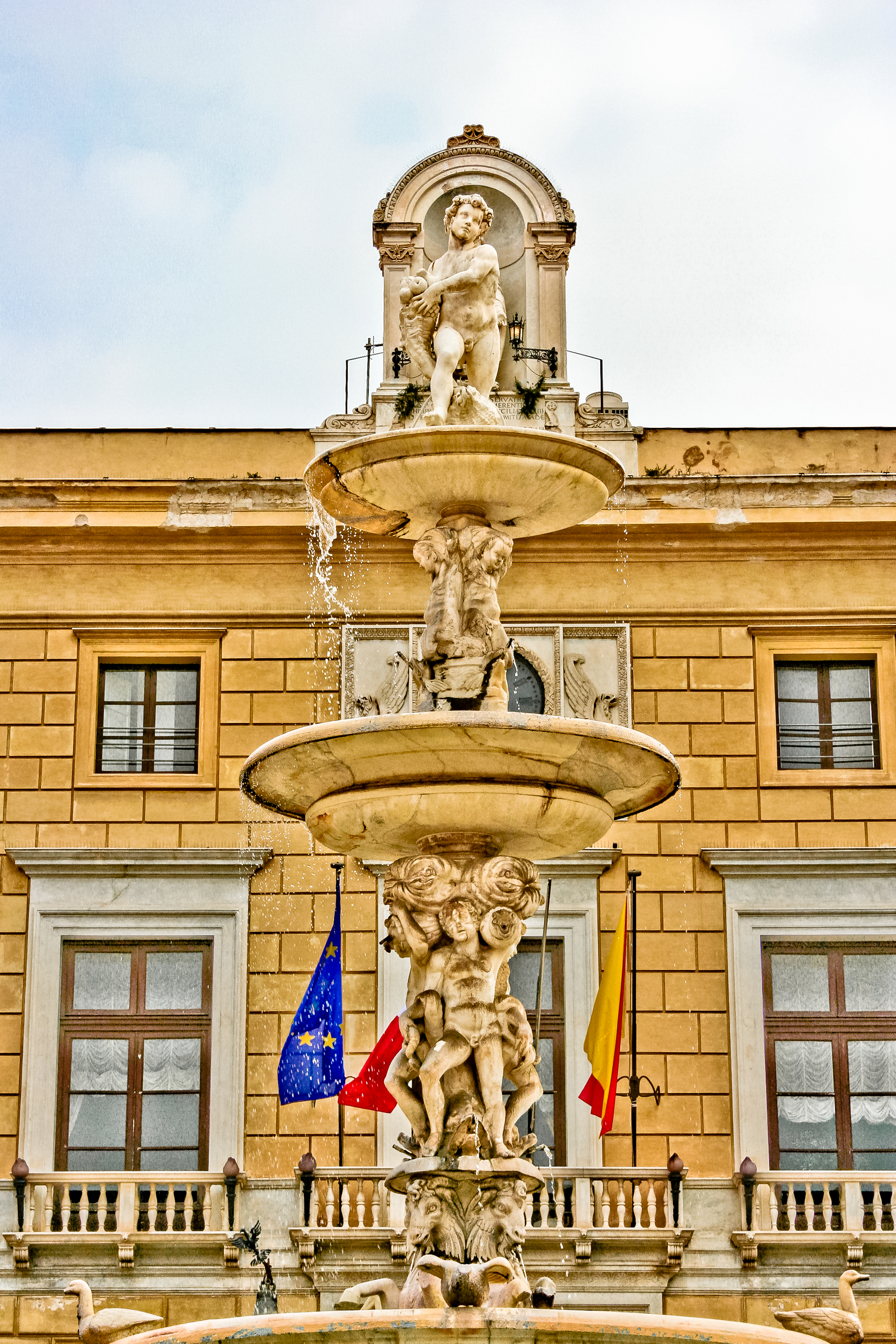

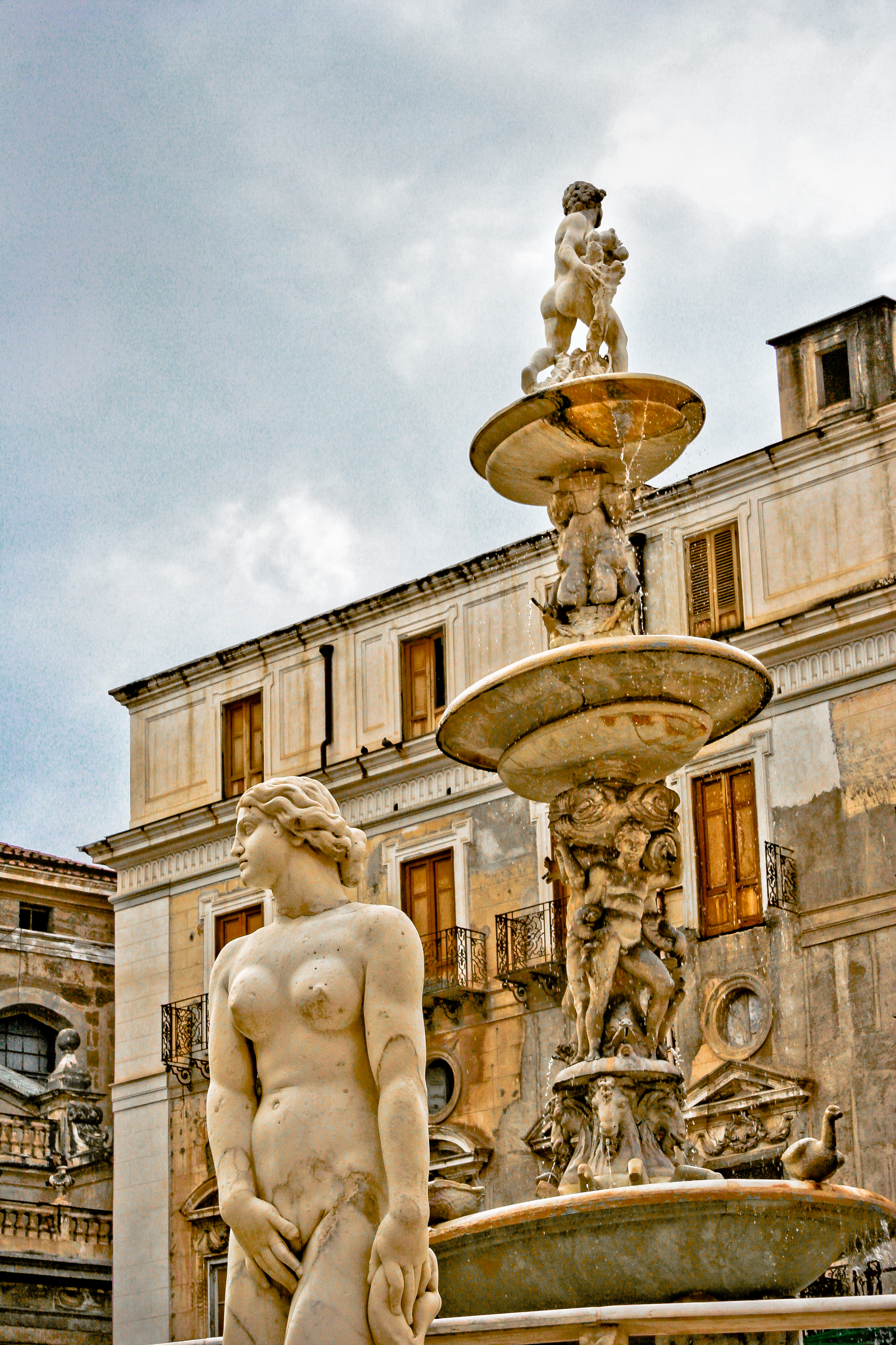

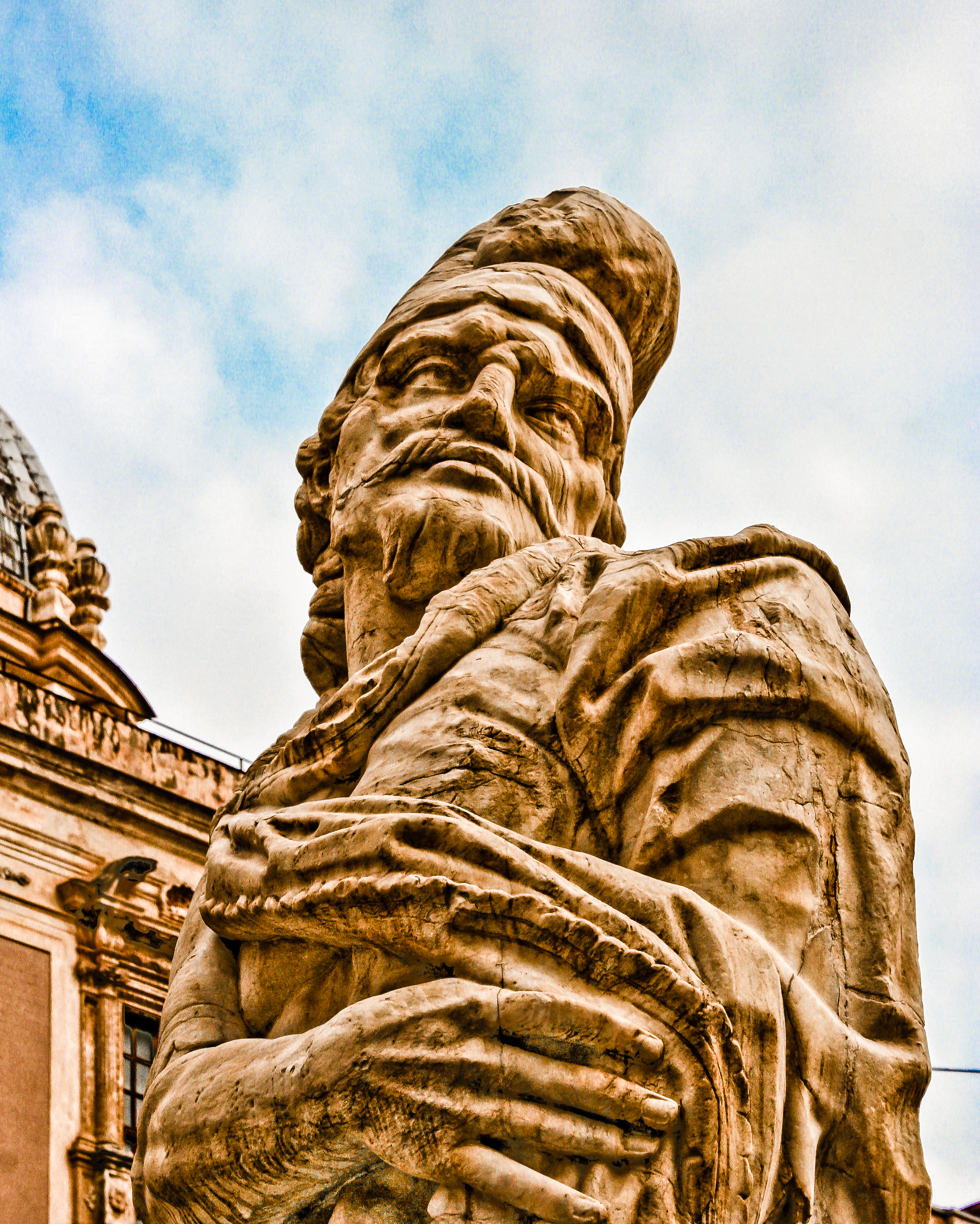

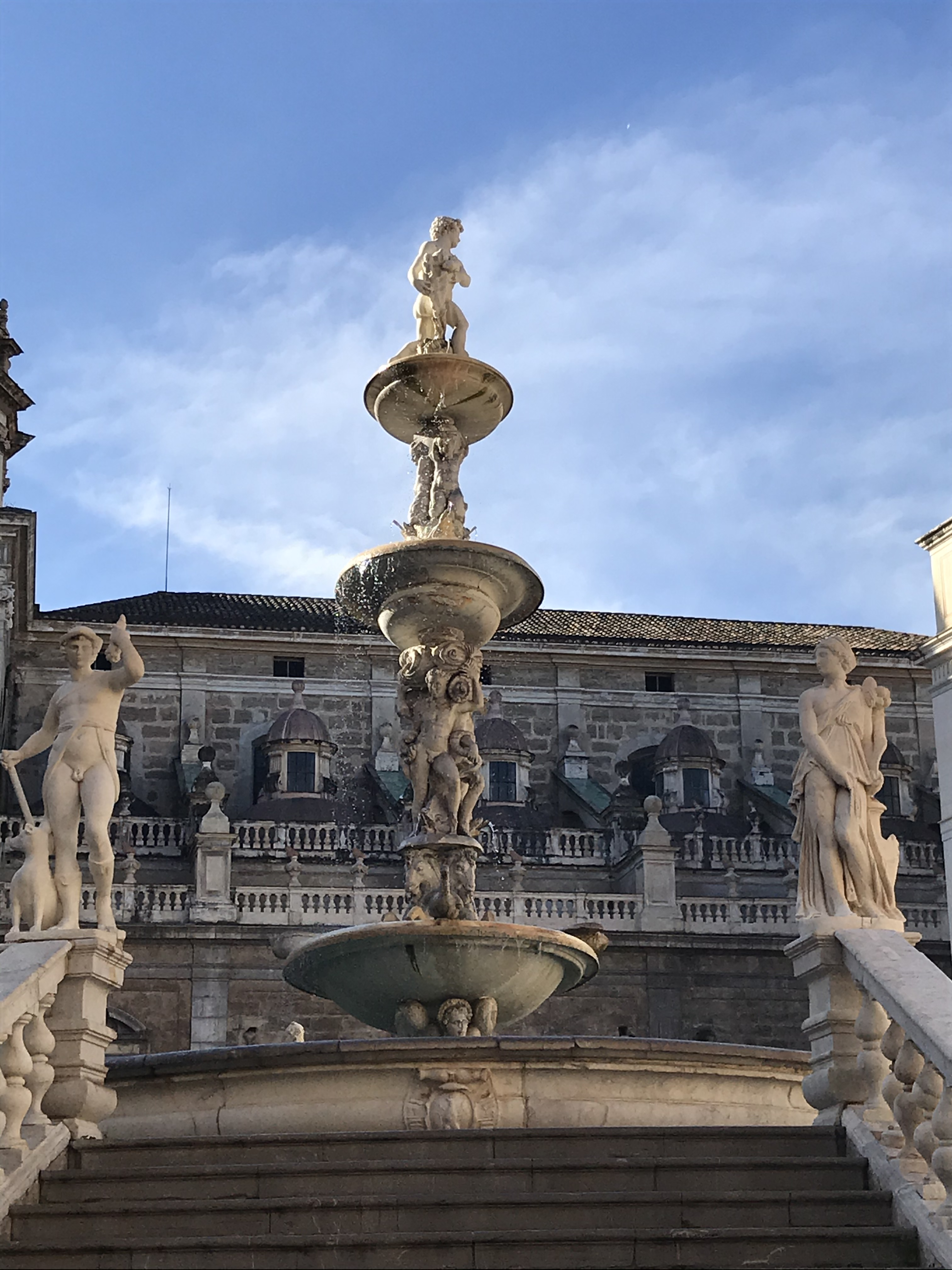

== See also ==
- Piazza Pretoria
- Palazzo Pretorio
- Santa Caterina
