= Fortezza del Tocco =

- Acireale, Sicily, Italy
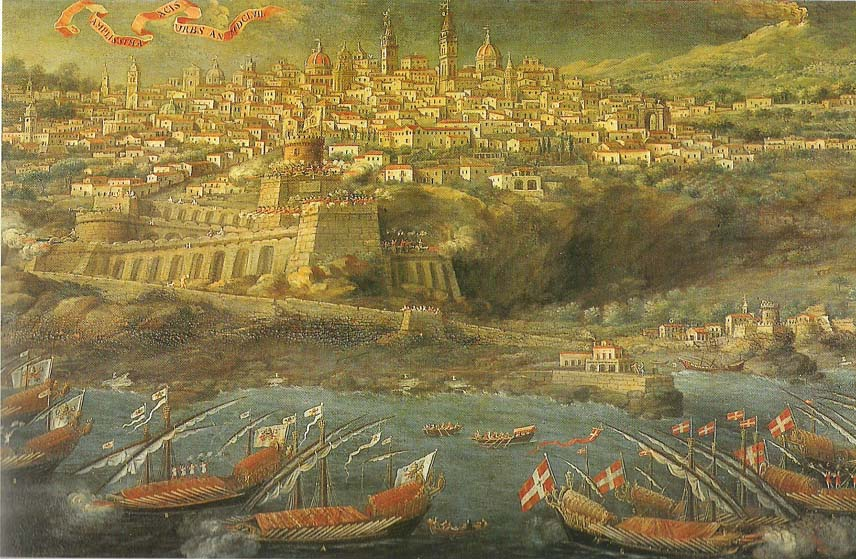
- Fortezza del Tocco in a 1657 painting

Site information
- Type: Fort
- Owner: Public
- Open to the public: Yes

Location
- Coordinates: 37°36′47.1″N 15°10′18.7″E

Site history
- Built: 1592–1616
- Built by: Spanish Empire/Kingdom of Sicily
- In use: 16th–19th centuries

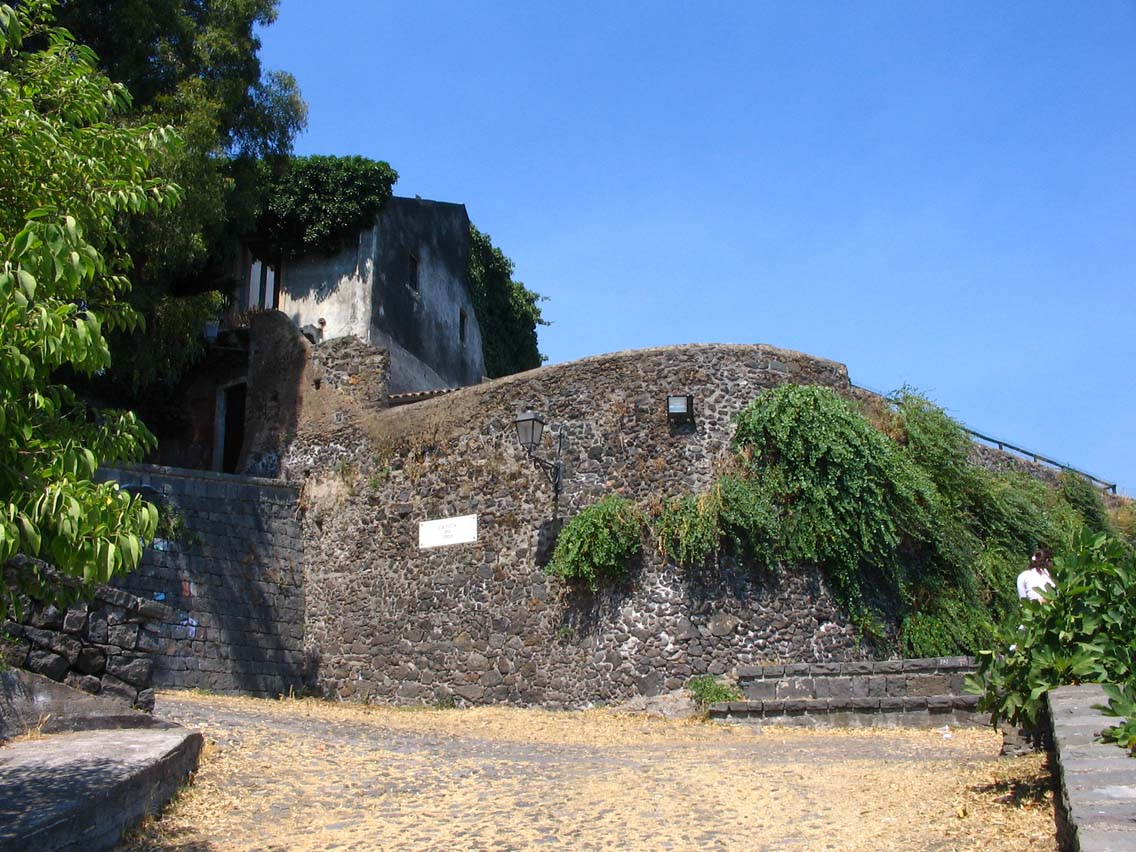

The Fortezza del Tocco is a fort in Acireale, Sicily. It was built in the 16th century to defend the city from attacks by pirates.

== History ==
After the Battle of Lepanto in 1571, the Barbary pirates continued to raid the Sicilian coastline. In 1582, Uluç Ali attempted to raid Acireale. Although the raid was unsuccessful, the population were afraid of further attacks and began fortifying the area.

The Spanish (then the rulers of the Kingdom of Sicily) built the Fortezza del Tocco between 1592 and 1616. The fort was designed by Camillo Camilliani and Vincenzo Geremia. Other nearby fortifications that were also built around the same time as the Fortezza del Tocco include the Torre Alessandrano, the Torre di Sant'Anna and the Garitta di S. Tecla.

Some modifications were made to the fort in the early 17th century. It repelled a French attack in 1675.

The fort lost its importance and was decommissioned in the 19th century. Its last guns were removed in 1834, and were taken to the Pinacoteca Zelantea de Acireale, where they remain today.

Since 1999, the fort and the surrounding area have been a nature reserve. It is open to the public.
