= Manfria =

- Frazione
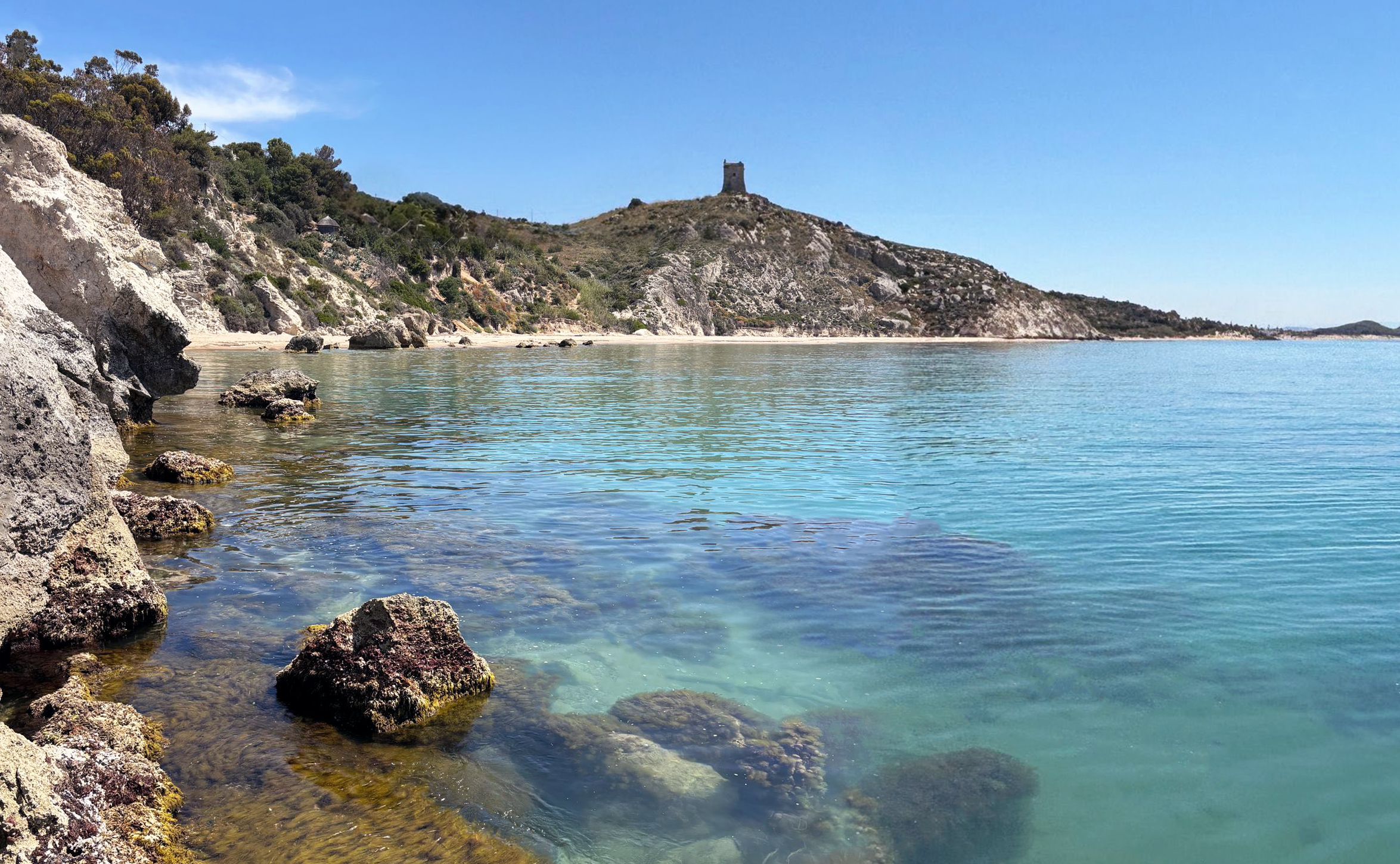
- View of Manfria beach with the coastal tower

- Location of Manfria in Italy
- Coordinates: 37°06′00″N 14°08′20″E
- Country: Italy
- Region: Sicily
- Province: Caltanissetta (CL)
- Comune: Gela
- Elevation: 19 m (62 ft)

Population (2001)
  - Total: 387
- Demonym: Manfrinesi
- Time zone: UTC+1 (CET)
  - Summer (DST): UTC+2 (CEST)
- Postal code: 93012
- Dialing code: 0933
- Website: Website about Manfria

Manfria is a village and the only civil parish (frazione) of the municipality of Gela, in the Province of Caltanissetta, Sicily, Italy. In 2001, its population was 387.

== History ==
Around 340 BC, in Sicilian pottery, one of the 3 groups of workshops specialized in red-figure style was named "Lentini-Manfria Group" and was active in Syracuse and Gela.

Manfria, named after the homonym medieval coastal tower, grew in the second half of the 20th century. It received the official status of frazione after a municipal law of 24 January 2006.

== Geography ==
Manfria is a sea resort located on the Mediterranean coast, 12 km-far from Gela and 27 from Licata. It is composed by two inhabited areas, Manfria (western area) and Lido Manfria, in the east. The village is separated from Marina di Butera, a frazione of Butera, by the course of the river Comunelli.

== Tower of Manfria ==
The Tower of Manfria (Torre di Manfria, also named "Sferracavallo") is located upon a hill between the western area and Lido. It was part of a net of Sicilian coastal towers, built following the project of the Florentine architect Camillo Camilliani.

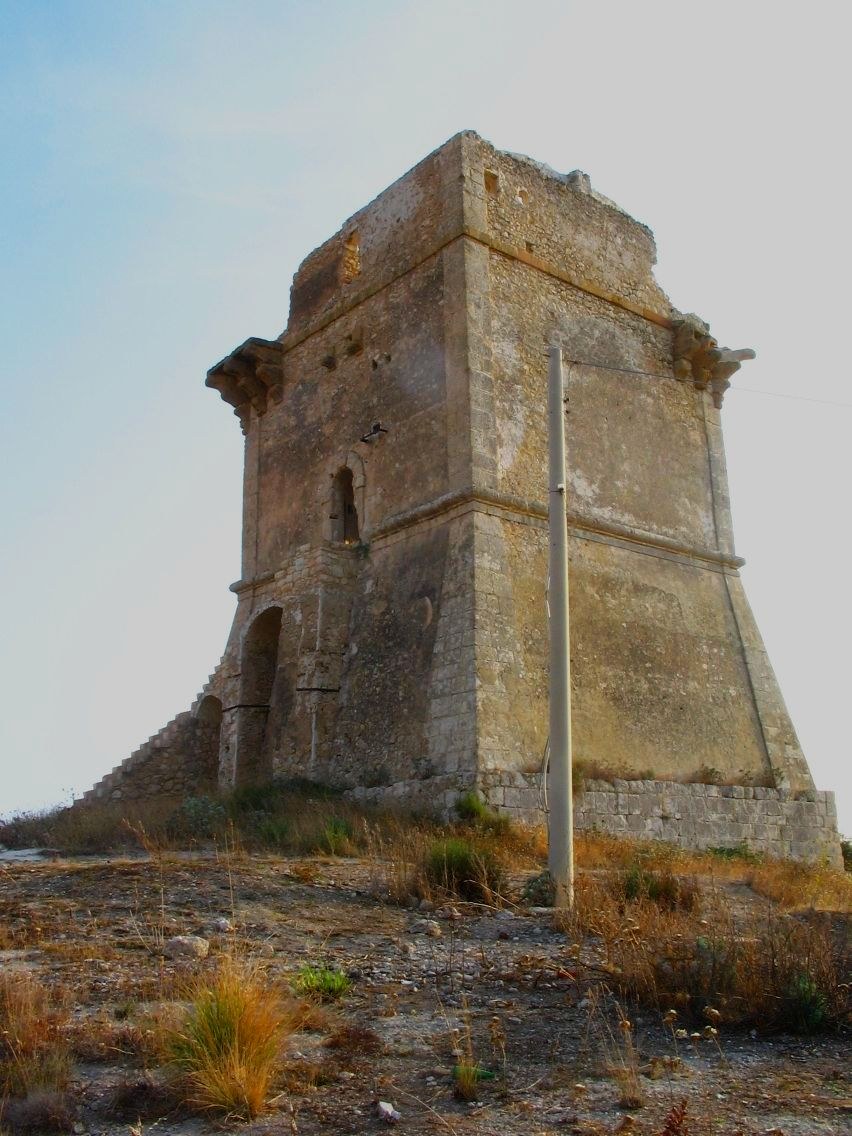
Torre di Manfria (1)

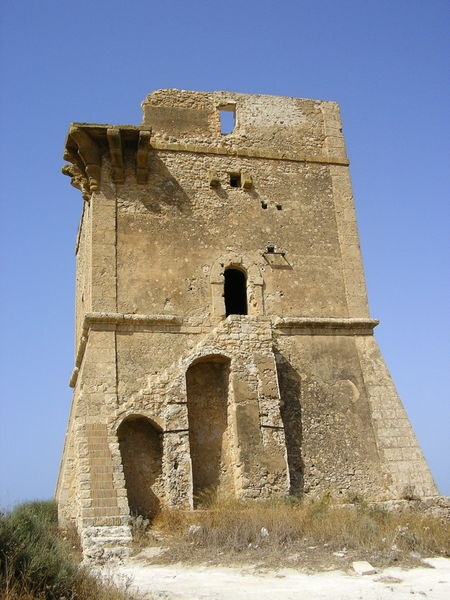
Torre di Manfria (2)
