= Camillo Camilliani =

Italian architect, military engineer and sculptor

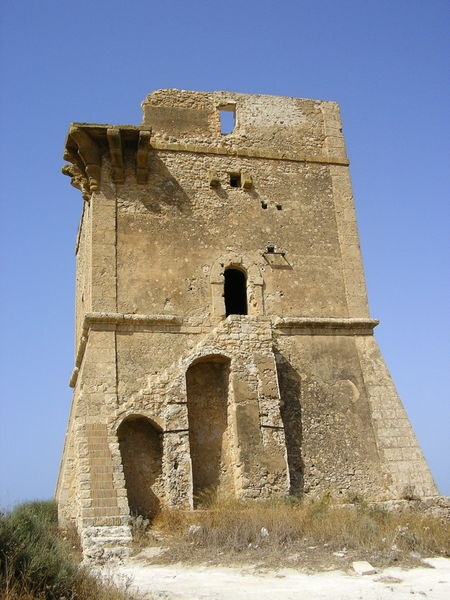
Torre di Manfria

Camillo Camilliani (fl. 1574–1603) was an Italian architect, military engineer and sculptor. He is mostly known for the design of watchtowers and other fortifications around the coasts of Sicily.

== Life ==
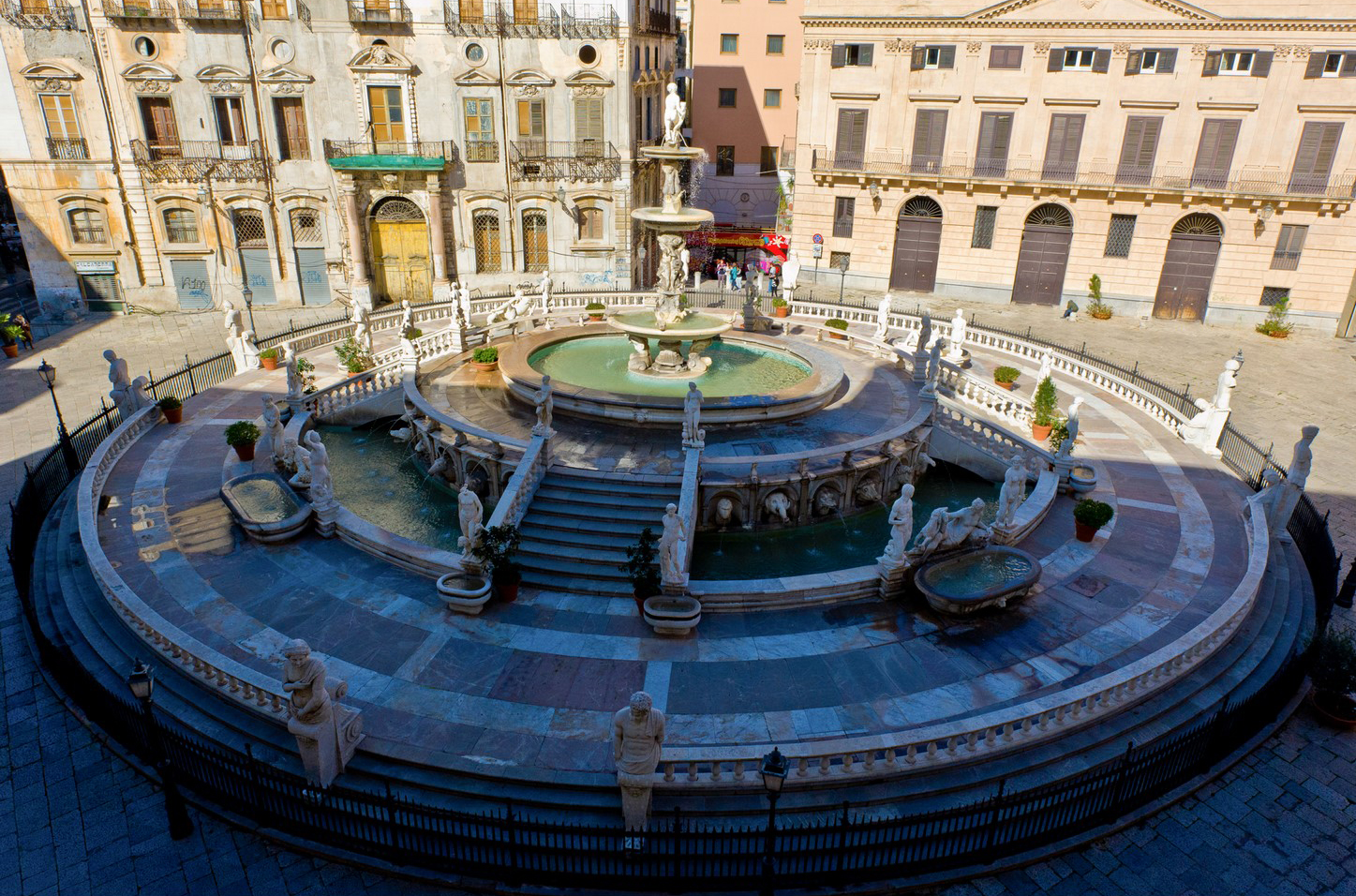
Piazza Pretoria & Municipio

Camillani was born in Florence sometime in the 16th century. He was the son of the sculptor Francesco Camilliani. In 1574, he and Michelangelo Naccherino directed the relocation of the Fontana Pretoria, which had been designed by his father, from Florence to Palermo.

In July 1583, Viceroy Marcantonio Colonna invited him to Sicily to design a system of coastal fortifications to prevent the island from being attacked by the Ottoman Empire or Barbary pirates. Camillani reviewed the existing fortifications, and in 1584 he published his findings in the report Descrittione delle marine di tutto il regno di Sicilia con le guardie necessarie da cavallo e da piedi che vi si tengono.

He went on to design watchtowers, which were built at strategic sites along the coastline, in such a way that they were able to communicate with each other and warn cities of any approaching enemy. The towers had a square base with two floors, and were armed with artillery pieces on the roof.

Camillani also designed fountains, statues and funerary monuments for various patrons and churches.

== Works ==
Camillani designed the following buildings, among others:

=== Fortifications ===
- Fortezza del Tocco, Acireale
- Torre di Manfria, Gela
- Towers of Vendicari, Capo Passero and Punta delle Formiche in the province of Syracuse
- Palazzo Baronale, Spadafora
- Castello di Roccavaldina
- Torre del Lauro, Caronia
- Torre di Fuori, near Isola delle Femmine
- Torre di San Giovanni, Torre di Roccazzo and Torre di Scopello in San Vito Lo Capo and Castellammare del Golfo
- Reconstruction of the Castello di Milazzo, Milazzo
- Torre Salsa, Siculiana
- Torre di Carlo V, Porto Empedocle
- Torre di Monterosso, Realmonte
- Torre Sant'Angelo, Licata
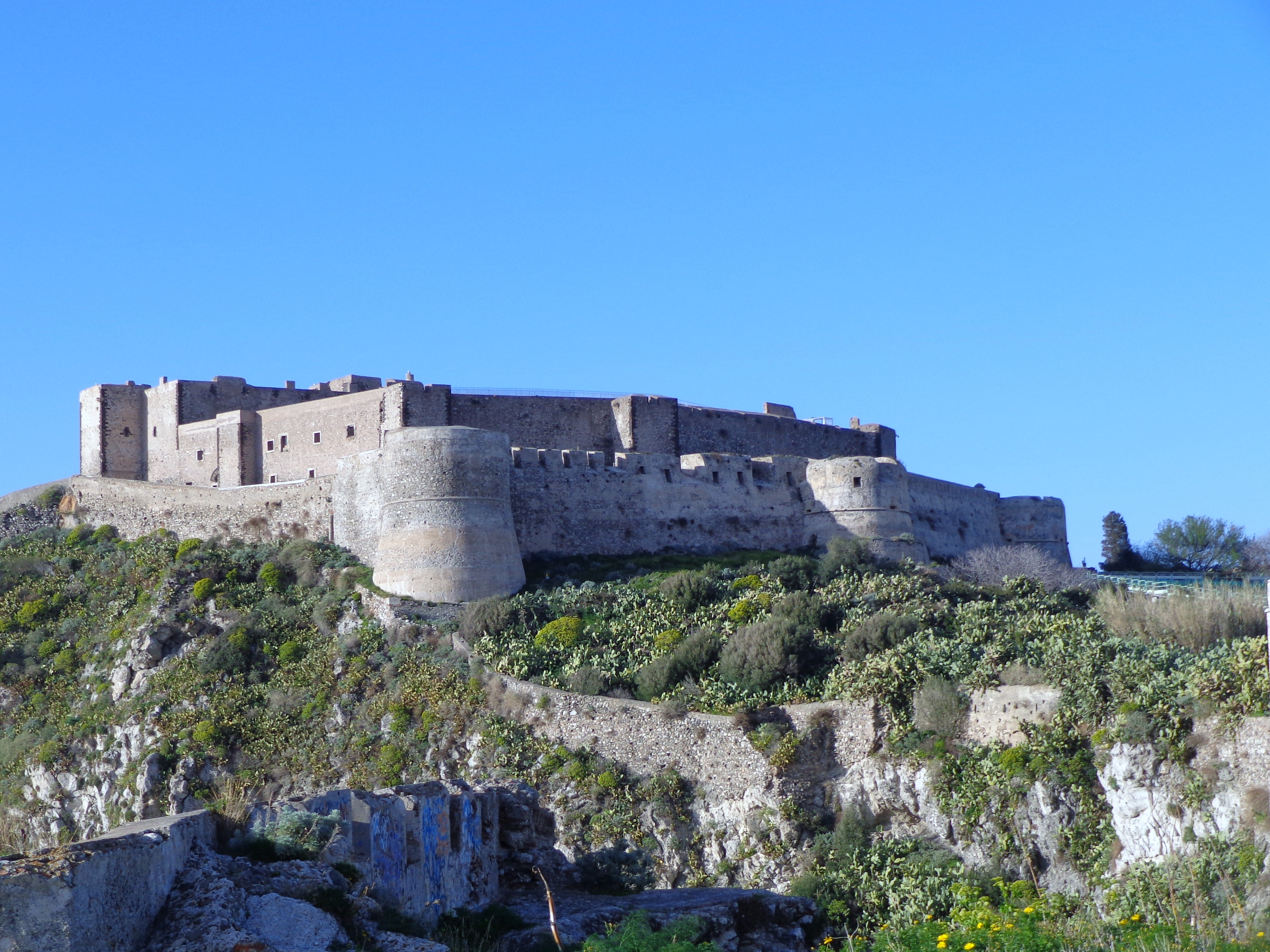
Castle of Milazzo

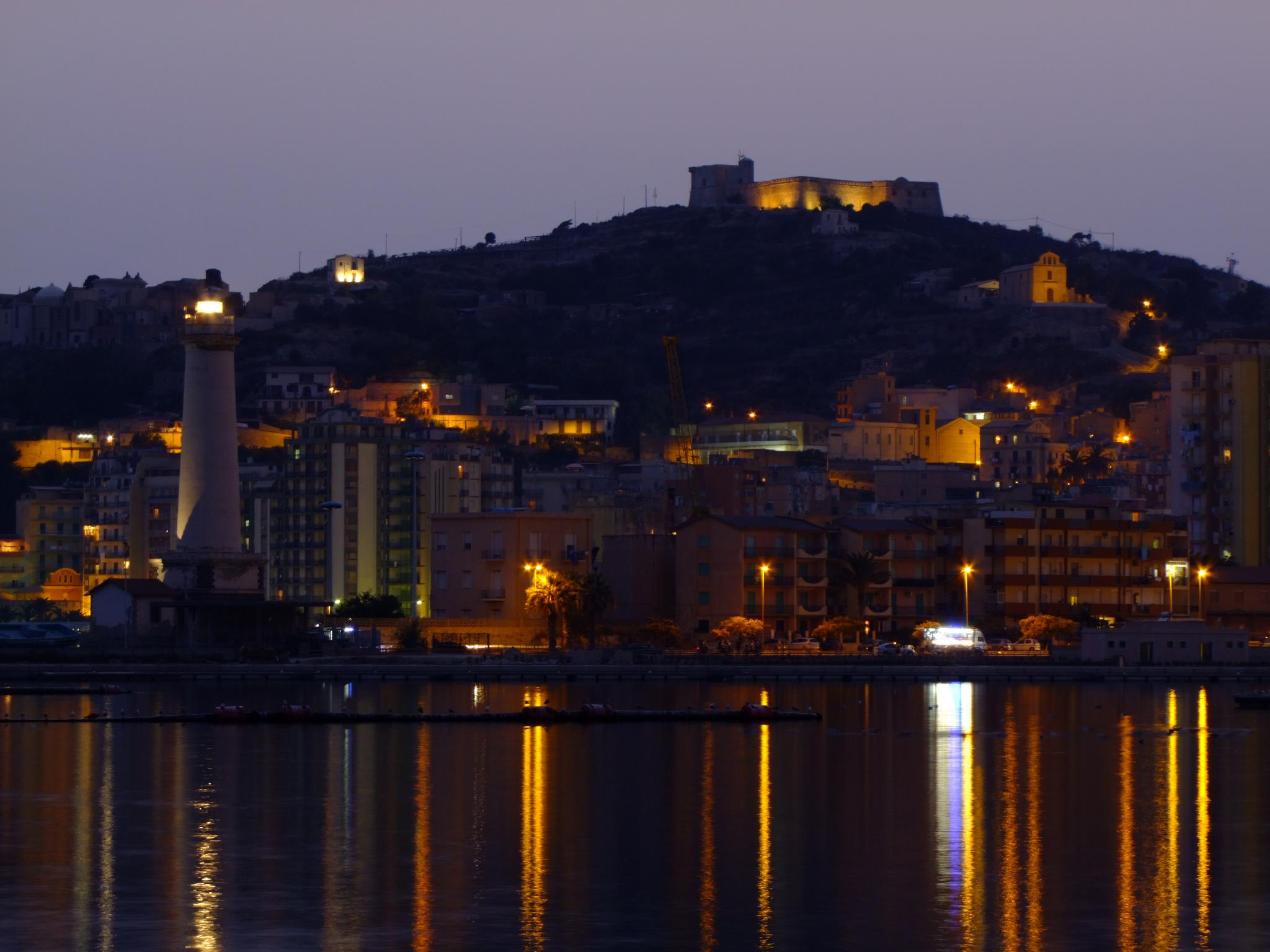
Castle of Sant' Angelo Licata

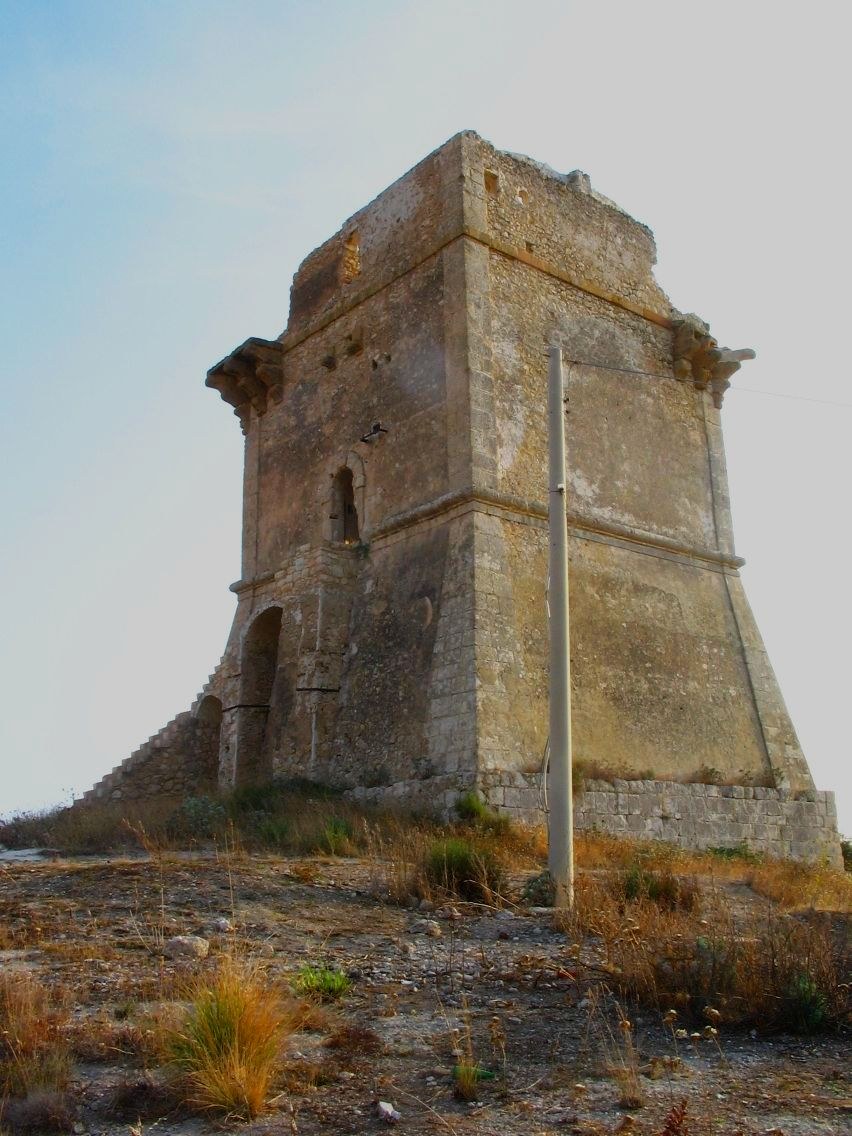
Tower of Manfria (Gela)

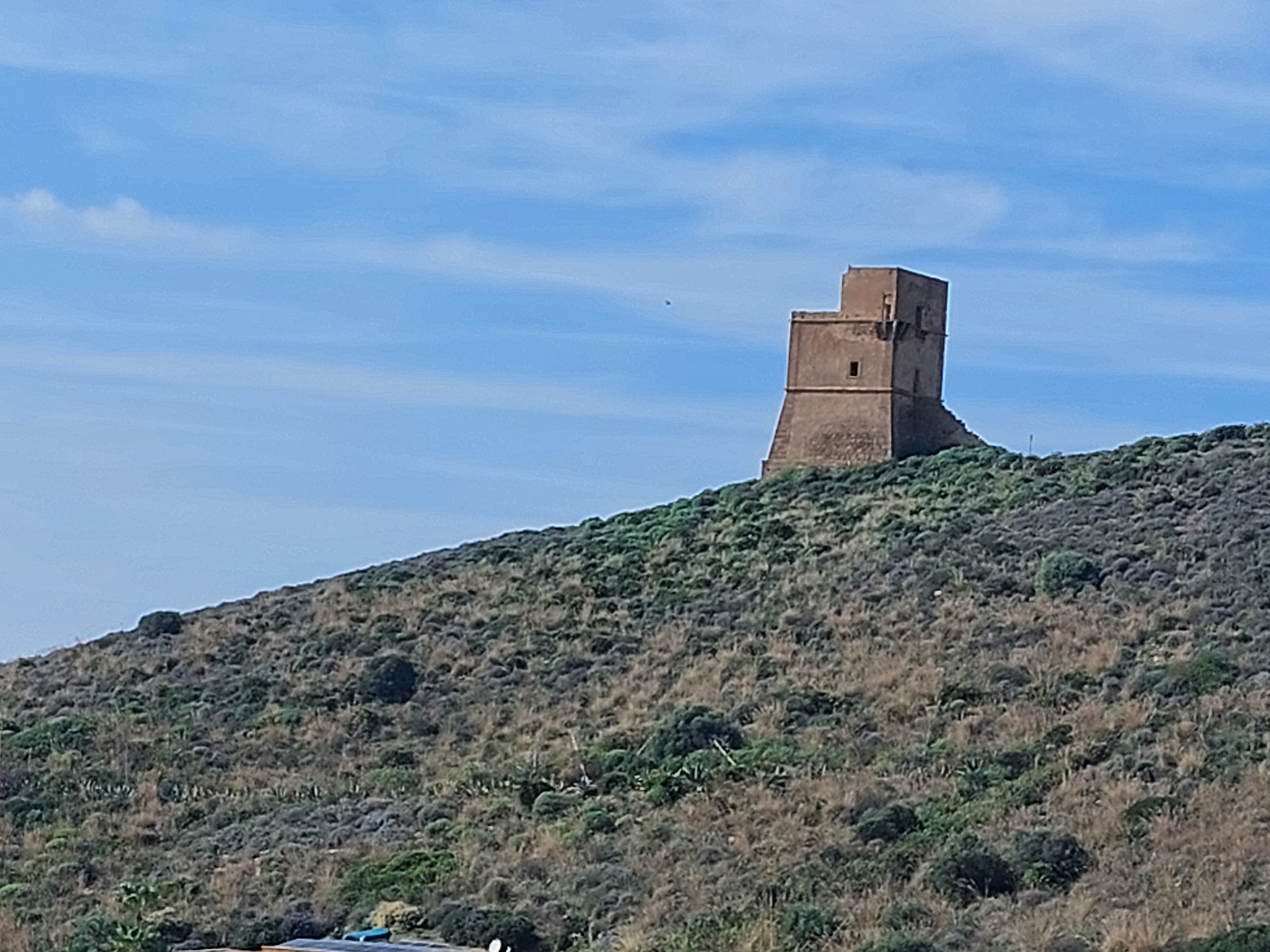
Tower of Monterosso near Realmonte

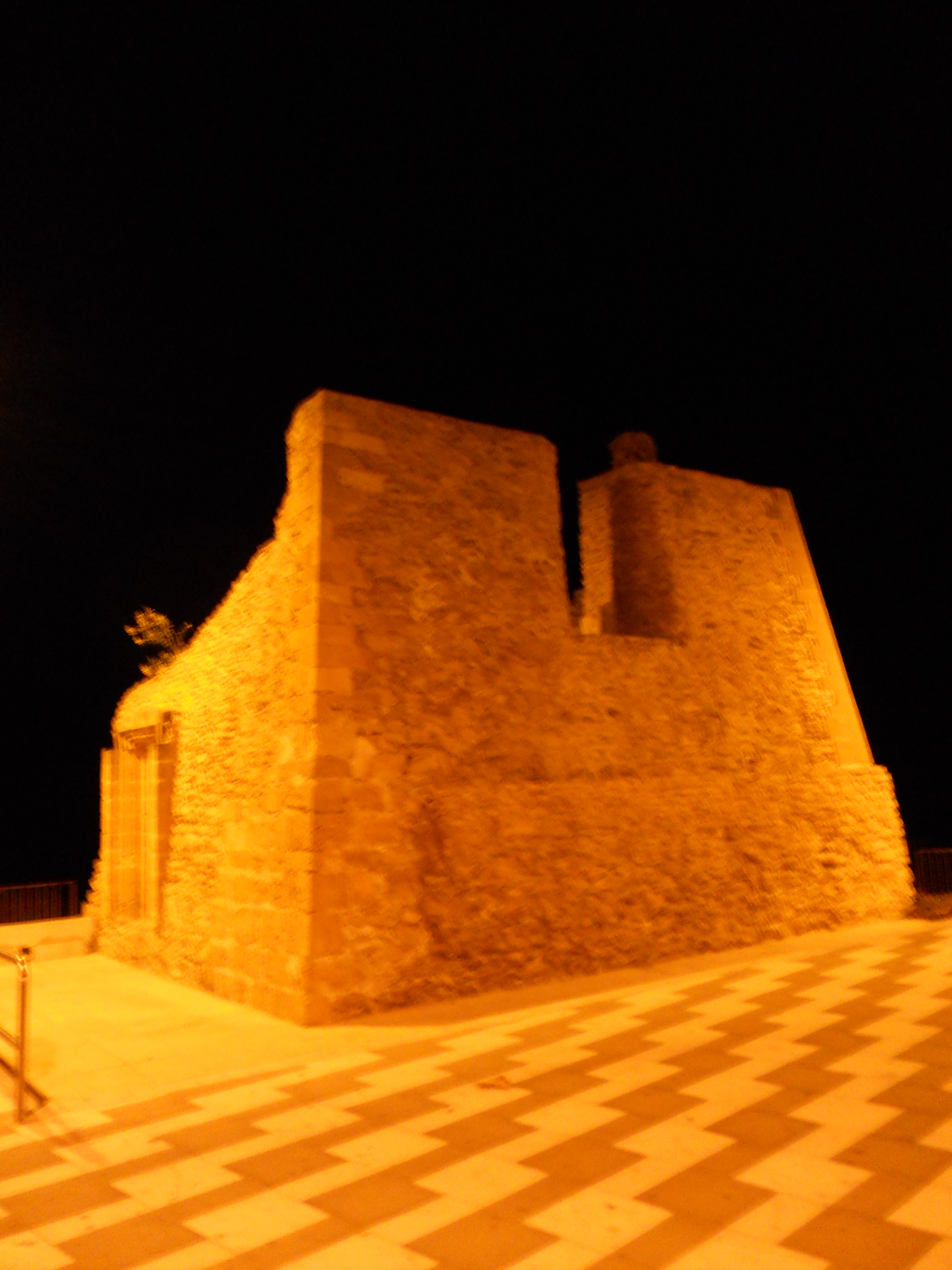
Tower of Tre Fontane (Campobello di Mazara)

=== Other works ===
- Façade of the Church of St. John of Malta in Messina
- Fontana della Flora in Villa Vittorio Emanuele, Caltagirone
- He possibly worked on the Cathedral of Milazzo
- Two fonts for the Catania Cathedral
- A Glauco for the Royal Palace of Palermo
- Sculptures for churches in Roccavaldina
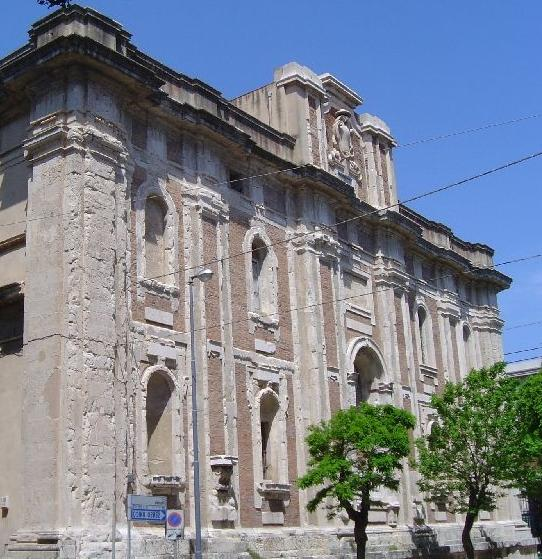
Church di San Giovanni di Malta (Messina)

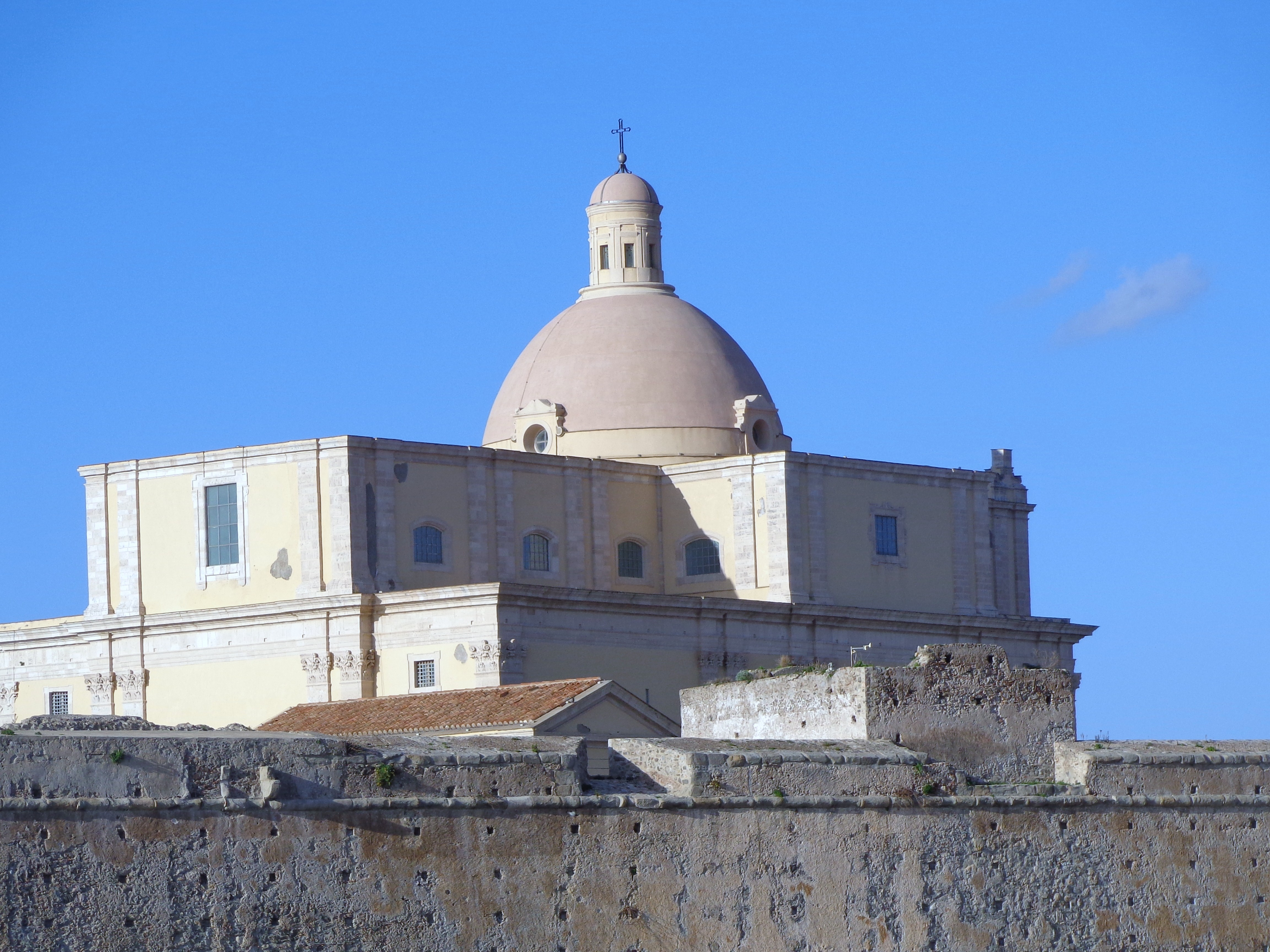
Old cathedral Santo Stefano Protomartire (Milazzo)

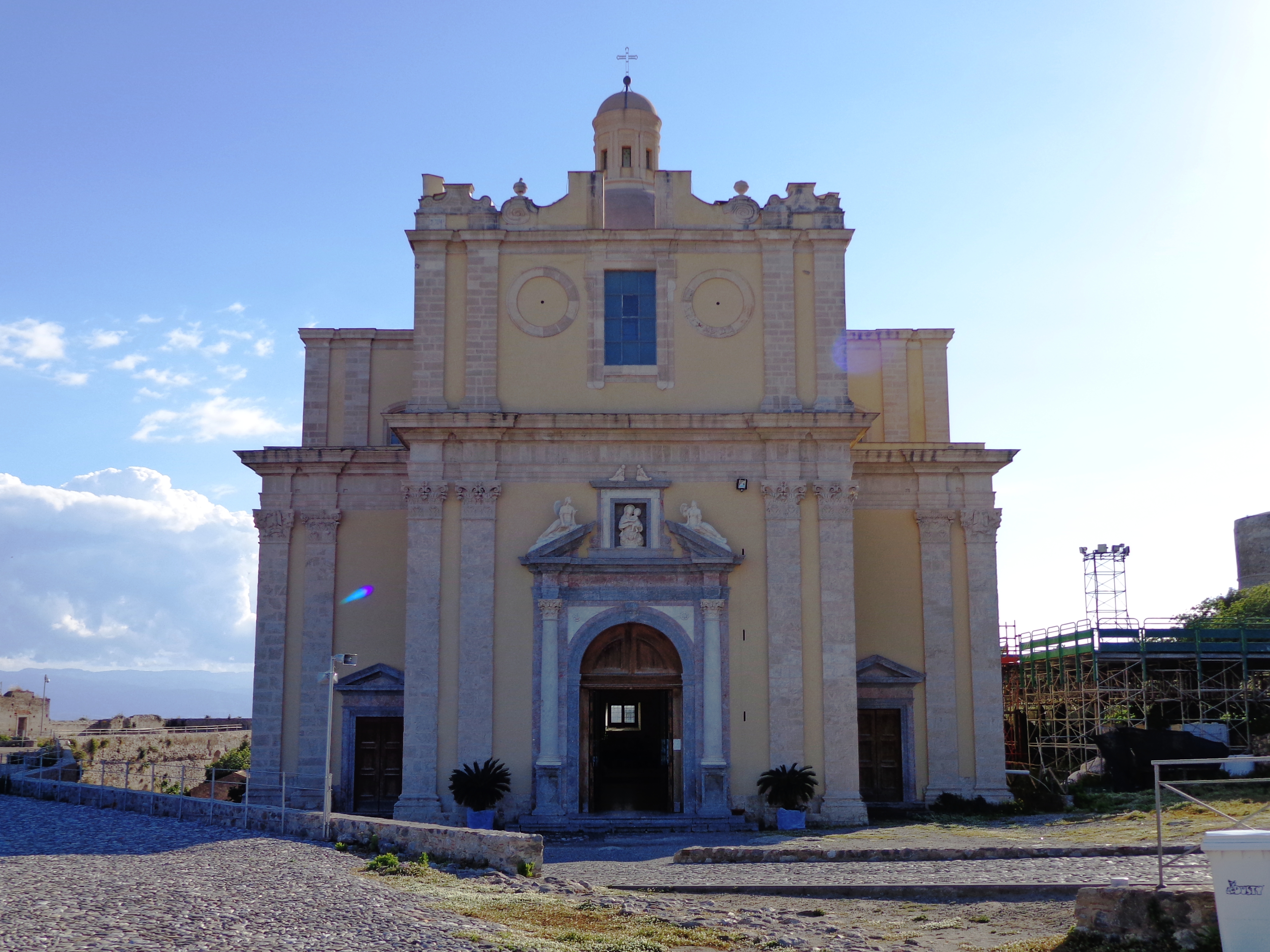
Old cathedral Santo Stefano Protomartire, facade (Milazzo)

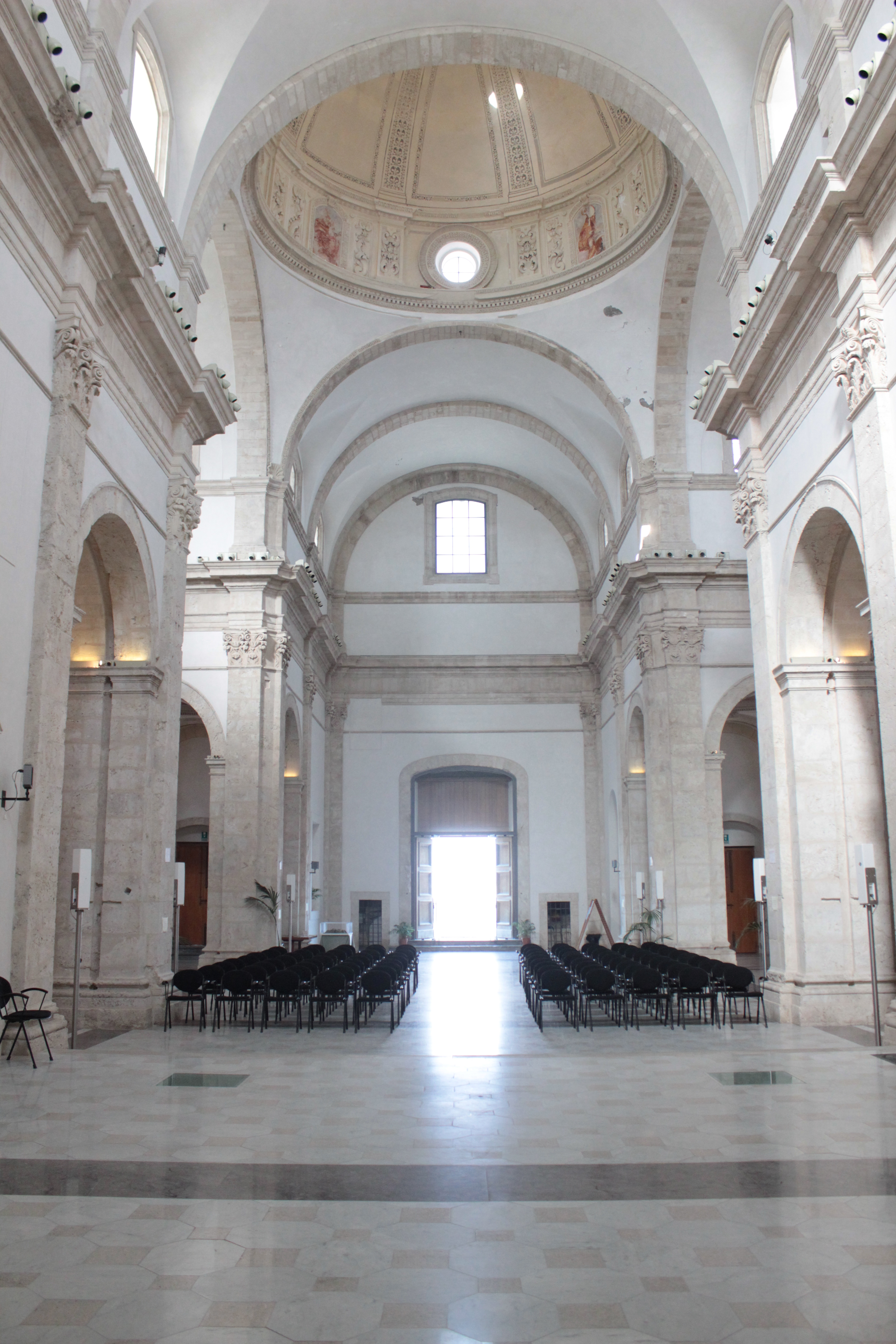
Old cathedral Santo Stefano Protomartire, interior (Milazzo)

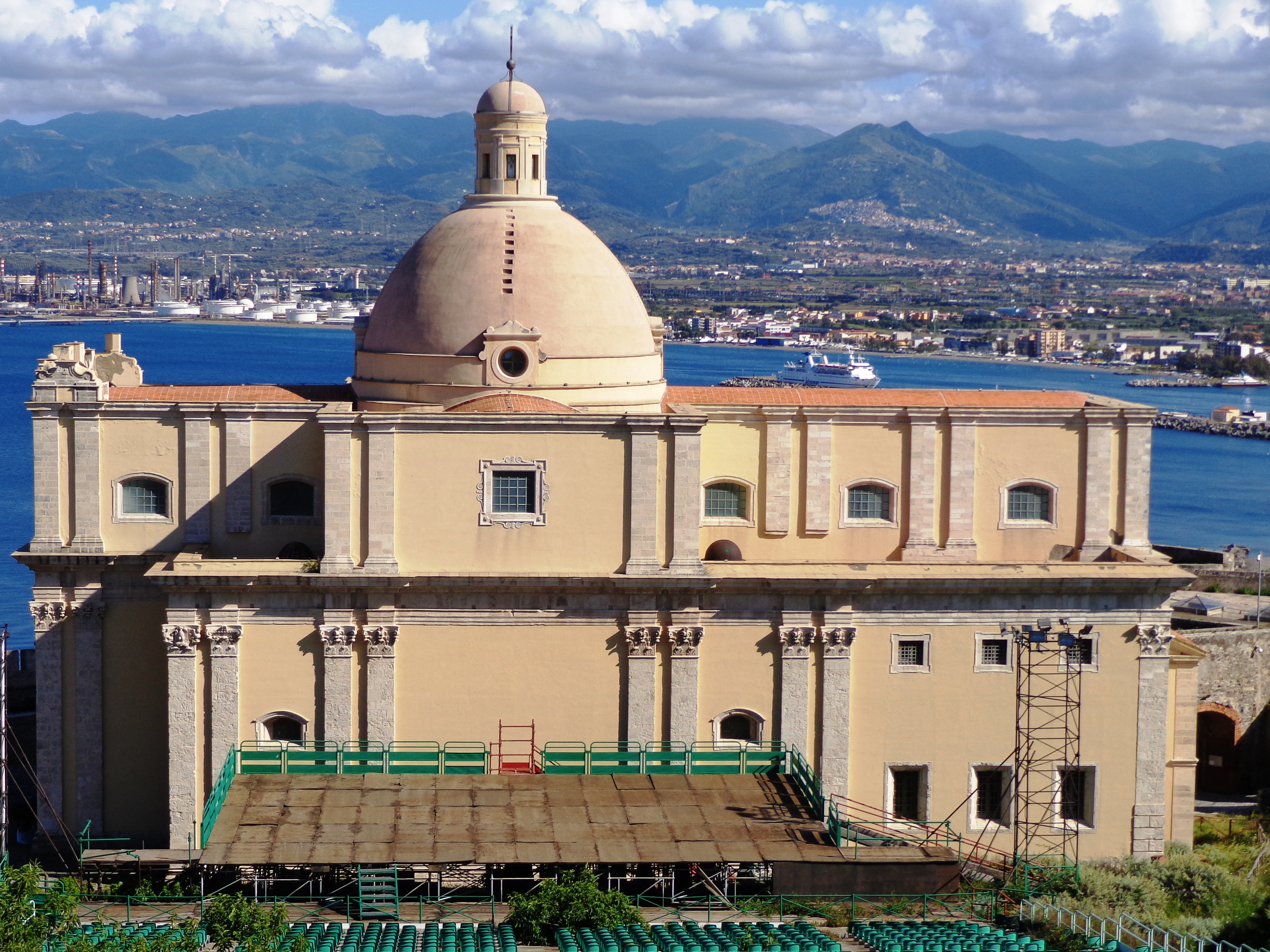
Old cathedral Santo Stefano Protomartire, west side (Milazzo)
