= Francesco Camilliani =

Italian sculptor

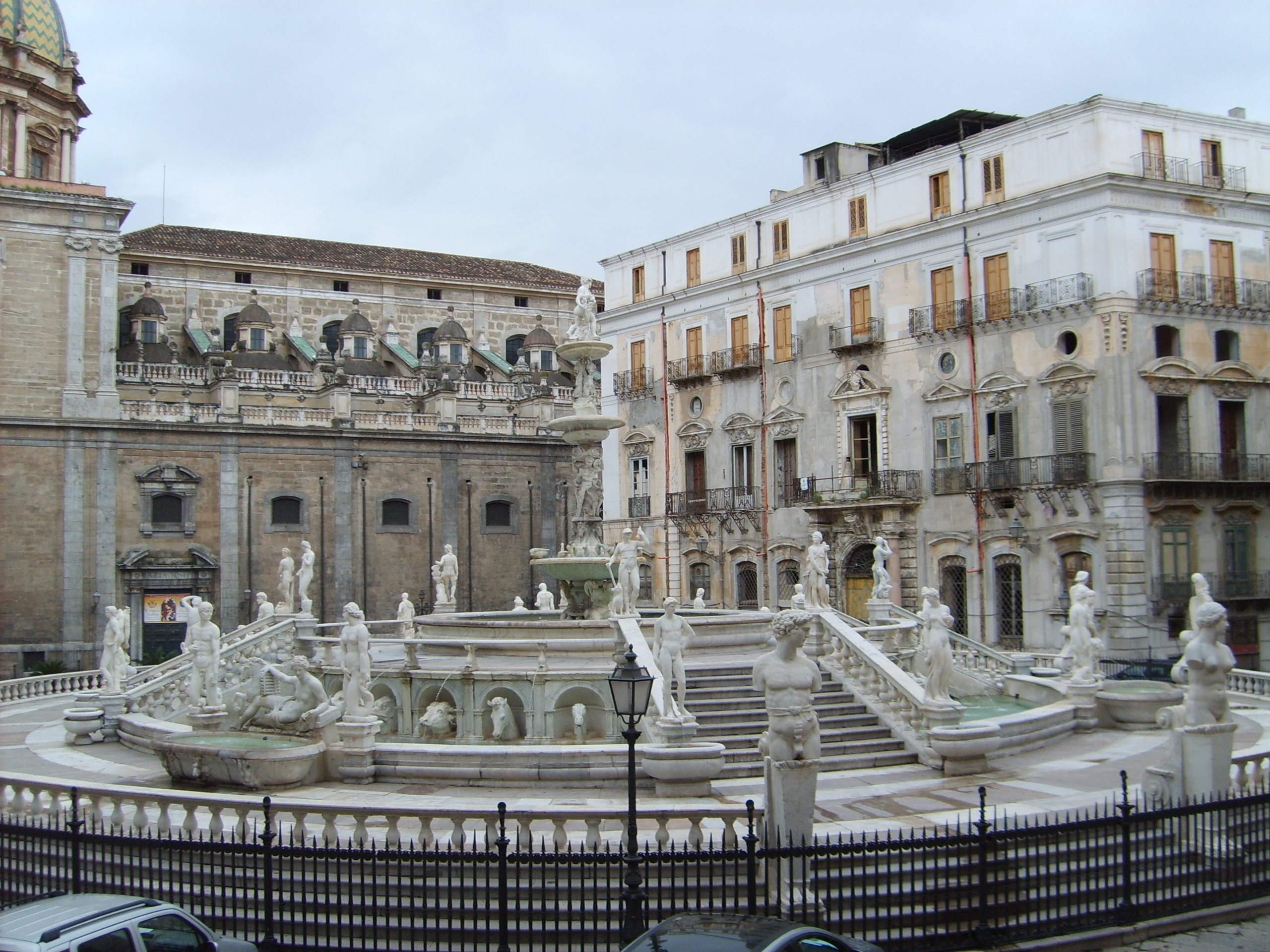
Camilliani's fountain in Piazza della Pretoria, Palermo.

Francesco Camilliani (1530 Florence – 1586) was a Tuscan sculptor of the Renaissance period. He studied in Florence under Baccio Bandinelli. His son Camillo Camilliani (died 1603) was later a sculptor too, working in Palermo, where he also worked as an architect and held the post as well of ingegniere del Regno, "engineer to the Kingdom of Sicily". His half-brother was Santi Gucci, a sculptor and architect for the Polish kings.

Camilliani was praised in one of Cosimo Bartoli's Ragionamenti Accademici; in the course of a stroll through Florence the interlocutors in Bartoli's dialogue say of one of Camilliani's statues, that, had it been buried and rediscovered, it would have been praised heartily.

Francesco Camilliani's most notable work by far is the Renaissance fountain in the Piazza Pretoria in Palermo, the Fontana Pretoria. This piece was originally commissioned for the garden of the villa outside Florence of Luigi Alvarez de Toledo, son of the viceroy Don Pedro Álvarez de Toledo and brother-in-law of Cosimo I de' Medici; it was completed in 1555. Camilliani was aided in the grand project by the garzoni of his studio, including the Florentine Michelangelo Naccherino (1550–1622), or Vagherino Fiorentino. In its original site, Giorgio Vasari called it a "most stupendous fountain that has not its peer in Florence or perhaps in Italy." Under pressure to make economies in his style of living, and perhaps with reservations about the completed fountain's crowd of ignudi, in January 1573 Don Luigi permitted it to be bought by the Senate of Palermo, through the intervention of his brother Don Garçia, the former viceroy and Governor of Palermo. It was dismantled into six hundred and forty-four pieces and transported to Palermo, and set up there by Camillo Camilliani, who had to concentrate its elements in the more constricted urban space, and to oversee some additions to render it more suitable for Sicily, which included a Venus by Antonio Gagini. Re-erection at Palermo was complete in 1584. The sculpture of the fountain depicts fables, monsters, and nymphs all spraying jets of water, which also falls and cascades between them. Once locally known as the Fontana della Vergogna, the "fountain of shame”, because of the nude statues that stand around the base of each tier, it is one of the few true pieces of High Renaissance art in Palermo.
