= Richard the Qaid =

Richard the Qaid (fl. 1166–1187) was a senior official (qāʾid, commander) of the royal council (curia regis or diwan) in the court of the Norman Kingdom of Sicily at Palermo during the latter years of the reign of William I of Sicily and during the regency of his wife, Margaret of Navarre, for their son William II. He was already the Great Chamberlain, or magister camerarius, when William I died in 1166.

== Origin ==
Richard was a Muslim convert to Christianity, and likely a eunuch. He possibly appears in the records of the royal council in January 1161, but he rose to prominence in the political affairs of the day only in 1166.

== Career during the regency for William II ==
=== Appointment as master chamberlain and familiaris regis ===
In that year, King William I died on 17 May, leaving his underage son William II on the throne, under the regency of the Queen-mother, and advised by a council of three familiares regis under the leadership of Peter the Qaid. Although in effective control of the government, Peter was unable to counter the court intrigues, led by a faction around the Queen-regent's cousin, Gilbert, Count of Gravina, which paralysed the Kingdom. As a result, in the summer of the same year, Peter fled to Tunis. Richard succeeded him as master chamberlain of the palace (magister camerarius regii palatii), and became a member of the council of the familiares regis, now expanded to five members (alongside Richard, these were Richard, Count of Molise, the Bishop-elect of Syracuse Richard Palmer, the notary Matthew, and Martin the Qaid).

=== Opposition to Stephen du Perche ===
In October or November 1166, Stephen du Perche was appointed chancellor and Archbishop of Palermo, becoming the head of government. During Stephen's rule, Richard remained a familiaris at least for some while in 1167, and he is recorded as one of the heads of the duana baronum in March 1168. This was a new department, charged with the administration of the Norman kingdom's provinces in the Italian mainland, except Calabria. Richard soon emerged as a leading opponent of the chancellor. The latter's efforts to combat corruption in the Sicilian administration soon led to an attack against Muslims or suspected crypto-Muslims, and a clash with the palace eunuchs, whose chief Richard was. Richard began plotting against the chancellor, gaining the support of Abu'l-Qasim ibn Hammud ibn al-Hajar—according to the contemporary traveller Ibn Jubayr, the hereditary leader of the Sicilian Muslims—and turning the initially supportive Muslim community of the island against Stephen. In autumn, he began marshalling his forces for a coup: these included, beside his own household troops, the royal knights (milites regis) and the court archers (curie sagitari), whose backing he had won through gifts and favours. However, the chancellor moved the king and the court to Messina, where he was able to neutralize his Norman opponents, the queen regent's brother, Henry, Count of Montescaglioso, and Richard of Molise.

According to the history of Hugo Falcandus, when Stephen returned with the king and court to Palermo on 20 March 1168, Richard and other courtiers plotted to have him assassinated on Palm Sunday, four days later. The conspiracy was discovered, and Richard's co-conspirators were arrested; Richard himself was protected from arrest by the Queen, but was confined to the palace and forbidden from speaking to the knights. This marked the high point of Stephen's power, but events soon began to turn against him, as a popular revolt broke out in Messina and spread across the island. Even in Palermo, there were clashes between Richard's supporters and Stephen's men, forcing the chancellor and his supporters to flee to the cathedral's bell tower. Richard and Matthew of Salerno now resumed their previous positions, and mobilized the mob to surround the bell tower. Stephen accepted the terms now offered, leaving Sicily with his supporters.

Richard was re-appointed to the now ten-member council after Stephen's flight in spring 1168 and until September 1169, when Walter Ophamil took the reins of government. The poet Ibn Qalaqis, who visited Sicily during that time, dedicated a qaṣīda to "Richard the vizier". The poem praises Richard's qualities and high station, but does not provide many details about him.

== Later years ==
After that, he concentrated on his duties as master chamberlain, remaining in the position at least until 1183. Two other Qaids, the aforementioned Martin who for a time was a familiaris regis, and Materacius, served as his subordinate chamberlains.

Richard also held a position as one of the directors of the dīwān al-taḥqīq (the "bureau of verification", the executive department of the government, rendered as duana de secretis in Latin) until March 1187, which is the last time he is attested in the sources. In this capacity he was sent in December 1170 to investigate illegal appropriation of royal property in Messina, and is again attested as ordering investigations for similar offences in January 1183.

In 1186, Richard bought an estate near Patti from the Bishop of Lipari. In the deed, he is named as a chamberlain and master of the duana de secretis. Richard was to renovate the dilapidated property and enjoy its proceeds until his death, when it would revert to the Church. A similar arrangement was made a year later with the archbishop of Palermo in the capital itself.

== Sources ==
- Johns, Jeremy (2002). Arabic Administration in Norman Sicily: The Royal Dīwān. Cambridge and New York: Cambridge University Press. ISBN 978-0-521-81692-2.
- Matthew, Donald (1992). The Norman Kingdom of Sicily. Cambridge and New York: Cambridge University Press. ISBN 0-521-26284-4.
- Takayama, Hiroshi (1993). The Administration of the Norman Kingdom of Sicily. Leiden, New York and Cologne: BRILL. ISBN 978-90-04-09865-7.
