= Richard Palmer (bishop) =

English bishop of Syracuse and archbishop of Messina

Richard Palmer (ca 1130 – died 7 August 1195), an Englishman, was the bishop of Syracuse from 1169 and archbishop of Messina from 1182. Palmer first rose to prominence in 1160 as one of the triumvirate of grandees who replaced the assassinated Admiral Maio of Bari. He was "a man of great learning and eloquence," according to Hugo Falcandus.

== Bishop of Syracuse ==
On the death of Bishop Rinaldo de Lusio in 1154, Palmer was elected bishop of Syracuse, but he was not consecrated until 1169. On Saturday 11 March 1161, he joined with three other great ecclesiastics of the kingdom—Romuald II, Archbishop of Salerno; Robert, Archbishop of Messina; and Tristan, Bishop of Mazara—to incite the people of Palermo to rise against the rebels led by Matthew Bonnellus and free the royal family.

In 1162, Sylvester of Marsico died and Henry Aristippus was disgraced, thus Palmer was the only member of the original triumvirate left in power. The replacements, Matthew of Ajello and the caïd Peter, remained in power until the death of King William I in 1166. They automatically became the chief advisors of the regent, the queen mother Margaret of Navarre. Margaret, however, distrusted Palmer and Matthew and appointed the caïd above them, greatly disaffecting the two. Palmer joined Gilbert, Count of Gravina, cousin of the queen, in open opposition to the eunuch.

== Conflict over the see of Messina, pollical wrangling with Thomas Becket ==
At that time, Palmer was a candidate for the vacant archdiocese of Palermo, as were his fellow bishops: Tristan of Mazara, Roger, Archbishop of Reggio, and Gentile, Bishop of Agrigento. However, Margaret further ostracised the court by securing the consecration of Stephen du Perche, her own cousin, as archbishop (1167). Of all the ecclesiastical contenders, Palmer was most infuriated. The next year (1168), however, a rebellion led by Henry, Count of Montescaglioso, a brother to the queen, toppled the new archbishop and forced him to flee. Palmer was a guarantor of the outgoing Stephen's safety.

With Stephen gone a council was set up to assist Margaret. It included not only Palmer, but Romuald of Salerno, Gentile of Agrigento, John, Bishop of Malta, Matthew of Ajello, the new caïd Richard, Henry of Montescaglioso, Counts Richard of Molise and Roger of Geraci, and Walter of the Mill, a fellow Englishman who would eventually take up the Palermitan see so coveted of Palmer. Palmer had opposed Stephen and he opposed Walter, too. He joined the queen, not in writing to Pope Alexander III, but to Thomas Becket, who wrote back:

There is one other request, which I will whisper in your ear and which I hope you will grant me; and that is that you would do your utmost with the King and Queen to obtain the recall to Sicily of that noble man Stephen, Elect of Palermo; for reasons which shall at present be nameless and also because by doing so you will earn the lasting gratitude of the King of France and his entire Realm.

Clearly, Becket was unaware of Palmer's deep dislike of Stephen. Palmer was to become estranged from Becket in the near future, however. In 1170, Palmer and Robert of Loritello went to discuss the marriage of the young king with Joanna, daughter of Henry II of England. According to Becket, then at odds with Henry (odds that famously soon killed him), Palmer was enticed to the king's side by an offer of the bishopric of Lincoln. However, Palmer had recently been consecrated by the pope himself with the pallium and raised to metropolitan status: an offer of Lincoln, in England, would probably not have wooed him. After the betrothal was confirmed, Palmer and Alfano, Archbishop of Capua, travelled to Saint Gilles to receive Joanna and accompany her to Sicily (1176).

== Archbishop of Messina and death ==
In 1182, Palmer was transferred to the see of Messina. In 1190, he was part of a delegation along with the archbishops of Monreale and Reggio, Margaritus of Brindisi, and the strategos of Messina, Jordan du Pin, who failed in negotiations with Richard the Lion-Hearted. Palmer died soon after.

Palmer had tried but could not convince Peter of Blois to return to Sicily. Palmer was responsible for the glass and mosaics of Syracuse Cathedral. His tombe survives in the Cathedral of Messina, almost intact.

== Sources ==
- Norwich, John Julius. The Kingdom in the Sun 1130-1194. Longman: London, 1970.
- Hugo Falcandus. History of the Tyrants of Sicily at Patrologia Latina.
