= Bohemond II of Manoppello =

Bohemond II (died 1169) was the count of Manoppello, succeeding his father, Bohemond I, in 1156 or 1157. He was an Italian noble at the time.

In 1160, Bohemond joined a conspiracy of nobles, including Richard of Aquila, Roger of Acerra, and Gilbert of Gravina. The conspiracy was of only minor lords, but it gained traction. The aim of the conspirators was to assassinate the admiral Maio of Bari and in this they succeeded on 10 November. The rebellion which followed was short-lived, and Gilbert and Bohemond were restored to favor. It has been suspected that Gilbert and Bohemond were in some sort of intimate relationship, although this is and highly suspect.

In 1161, in a war with Robert III of Loritello, an old enemy of his father, he was driven out of his county. In 1167, he was again driven from his domains by the imperial army of Frederick Barbarossa led by Rainald of Dassel, the archbishop of Cologne.

In 1168, Bohemond accused Richard, Count of Molise, of conspiracy against the new chancellor Stephen du Perche. A duel was scheduled when Count Robert of Caserta came forward with a second accusation. It was alleged that the Apulian town of Mandra among others near Troia was unlawfully obtained at the expense of the crown. A jury was assembled and found Richard guilty of illegally retaining the lands after the flight of the chancellor Peter. He was dispossessed of all his lands and when he complained to the king was imprisoned. It is likely that the whole trial was engineered by Gilbert of Gravina, a political opponent of Richard's and an ally of Bohemond's.

Bohemond left one unnamed daughter who married Peter, who succeeded his father-in-law in the county.

== Sources ==
- Norwich, John Julius. The Kingdom in the Sun 1130-1194. Longman: London, 1970.
- Matthew, Donald. The Norman Kingdom of Sicily. Cambridge University Press: 1992.
- Houben, Hubert. Roger II of Sicily: A Ruler between East and West. Trans. G. A. Loud and Diane Milbourne. Cambridge University Press: 2002.
