= Robert of Caserta =

Robert of Lauro (died 1183) was the Count of Caserta, a powerful nobleman and administrator in the Kingdom of Sicily, "effectively the king's viceroy on the mainland" between 1171 and his death. He was a close colleague of Count Tancred of Lecce, the future king. His influence helped his cousin Roger become Archbishop of Benevento (1179–1225).

In 1168, when Count Bohemond II of Manoppello accused Count Richard of Molise of a conspiracy against the Chancellor Stephen du Perche, it was Robert who prevented the case from being settled by judicial duel when he alleged that Richard had also illegally acquired the town of Mandra and others near Troia from the crown. Robert was made the first master constable and master justiciar of the Duchy of Apulia and the Terra di Lavoro (in Latin, magister comestabulus et justitiarius Apuliae et Terra Laboris) in 1171, when a new system for governing the mainland territories of the kingdom was instituted following the restoration of royal authority in 1169 after years of unrest and open rebellion.

In 1171 Robert convened a curia (court) in Capua, outside his jurisdiction, with two royal justiciars, Matthew de Venabulo and John de Valle. In 1172 King William II ordered Robert and Count Richard of Gravina with the chamberlain (camerarius) of the Terra di Lavoro to determine whether the monastery of Sora had been gifted by William's predecessor, Roger II, with the rents of four churches. In 1173 he, two royal justiciars, and a chamberlain were in Capua to adjudicate a case relating to the abbey of Santa Sofia of Benevento. In 1176 Tancred of Lecce succeeded Richard of Gravina as constable and justiciar in the same district as Robert. While Tancred generally held court at Bari, Barletta and Troia, Robert was generally at Caserta, Capua or Aversa. The equal competence of either is illustrated by Robert's advice to the monks of Casauria that they could seek justice from either him or Tancred (1182).

In the autumn of 1176, Robert accompanied Richard Palmer and Alfanus of Camerota with twenty-five galleys to Saint-Gilles to take custody of Joan, daughter of Henry II of England, who was betrothed to William II. In 1182, following royal orders, Robert and Tancred of Lecce were in Aversa to pass judgement in the case of the Bishop of Marsia, who was unable to enforce his rights over the monastery of San Bartolomeo di Avezzano, which was supported by Gentilis de Palearia. The high standing of the litigants probably necessitated joint action by the justiciars. A list of those plaintiffs who required both justiciars to adjudicate during Robert's career suggests this: the Bishops of Teano and Sessa in 1171, the monastery of La Cava in 1171, 1177 and 1182, the Bishop of Venosa in 1176, the monastery of Montecassino in 1180, the Bishop of Benevento in 1180 and 1185, the Bishop of Bari in 1181, and the Bishop of Troia in 1183.

While at Aversa in 1182, Robert gave orders to the chamberlain of the Principality of Salerno "as though he was his normal superior". Robert was succeeded after his death by Count Roger of Andria.
