= Henry Aristippus =

Sicilian archdeacon and religious scholar (died 1162)

Henry Aristippus of Calabria (born in Santa Severina in 1105–10; died in Palermo in 1162), sometimes known as Enericus or Henricus Aristippus, was a religious scholar and the archdeacon of Catania (from c. 1155) and later chief familiaris of the triumvirate of familiares who replaced the admiral Maio of Bari as chief functionaries of the Kingdom of Sicily in 1161.

While the historian of Norman Sicily, John Julius Norwich, believes him to have probably been of Norman extraction despite his Greek surname, Donald Matthew considers it self-evident, based on both his name and occupations, that he was Greek. He was first and foremost a scholar and, even if Greek, he was an adherent of the Latin church.

Aristippus was an envoy to Constantinople (1158-1160) when he received from the emperor Manuel I Comnenus a Greek copy of Ptolemy's Almagest. A student of the Schola Medica Salernitana tracked down Aristippus and his copy on Mount Etna (observing an eruption) and proceeded to give a Latin translation. Though this was the first translation of the Almagest into Latin, it was not as influential as a later translation into Latin made by Gerard of Cremona from the Arabic. The original manuscript is probably in the Biblioteca Marciana in Venice.

Aristippus himself produced the first Latin translation of Plato's Phaedo (1160) and Meno and the fourth book of Aristotle's Meteorologica. He also translated Gregory of Nazianzus at the request of William I of Sicily.

In 1161, William appointed three familiares—Aristippus, Sylvester of Marsico, and the Bishop Palmer—to replace the assassinated Maio. In 1162, Aristippus was suspected of disloyalty by the king and imprisoned. He died probably soon after in that very year. He may have helped himself to some of the royal concubines during the rebellion of 1161. He does not seem to have been a particularly effective administrator. Sylvester of Marsico died at the same time and Matthew of Ajello and the caïd Peter replaced him and Aristippus in the "triumvirate."
