= Rotrou III of Perche =

Rotrou III
- Count of Perche
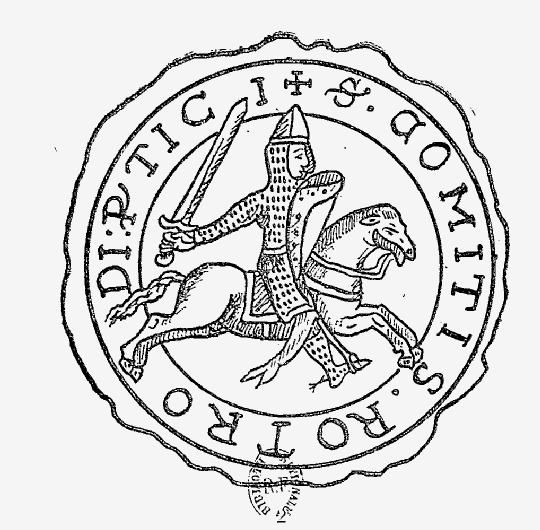
- Reign: 1099–1144
- Predecessor: Geoffrey II
- Successor: Rotrou IV
- Born: c. 1080
- Died: 8 May 1144
- Spouse: Matilda FitzRoy; Hawise
- Issue: Philippa; Felicia; Rotrou IV; Geoffrey; Stephan; Bertrand (illegitimate)
- House: Châteaudun
- Father: Geoffrey II
- Mother: Beatrix de Ramerupt

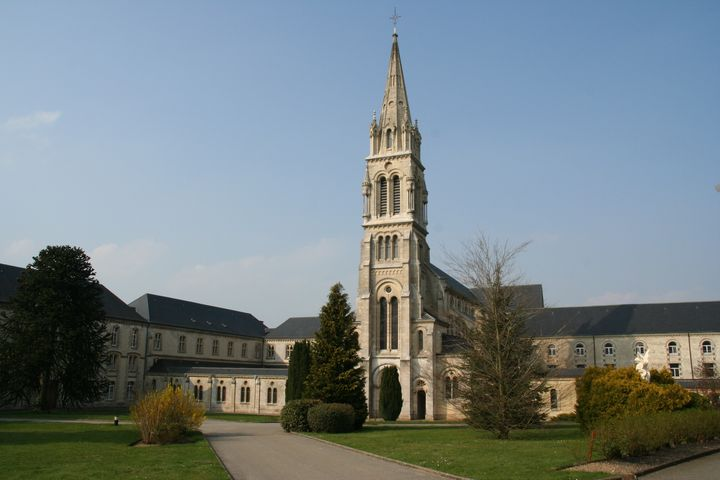
The monastery of La Trappe today

Rotrou III (bef. 1080 – 8 May 1144), called the Great (le Grand), was the Count of Perche and Mortagne from 1099. He was the son of Geoffrey II, Count of Perche, and Beatrix de Ramerupt, daughter of Hilduin IV, Count of Montdidier. He was a notable Crusader and a participant in the Reconquista in eastern Spain, even ruling the city of Tudela in Navarre from 1123 to 1131. He is commonly credited with introducing Arabian horses to the Perche, giving rise to the Percheron breed. By his creation of a monastery at La Trappe in memory of his wife, Matilda, daughter of Henry I of England, in 1122 he also laid the foundations of the later Trappists.

== First Crusade ==
Rotrou took part in the First Crusade, travelling with the army of the duke of Normandy, Robert Curthose. What influenced Rotrou in this regard were probably familial connexions. He was related to the Anglo-Norman aristocracy and the Perche was a march (border region) in southern Normandy. A sister was married to Raymond I of Turenne, who was a fellow Crusader in the following of Raymond IV of Toulouse. His mother, Beatrix, was a sister of Ebles II of Roucy, who had campaigned in Spain in 1073, and Felicia, who married Sancho Ramírez, King of Aragon. A religious motivation cannot be discounted.

According to the Chanson d'Antioche, Rotrou was under the command of Bohemond of Taranto during the Siege of Antioch, and was one of the first to go over the city's walls through scaling ladders on 3 June 1098. When the Crusaders had to confront a Seljuk relief force two weeks later in open battle, Rotrou was one of the front line commanders. He fulfilled his crusading vow and made it all the way to Jerusalem. The Chanson also mentions his bravery at the siege of Nicaea of 1097.

In 1107, Rotrou built a castle on land held partly allodially and partly in lordship by Hugh II of Le Puiset, thus challenging Hugh's rights to the estate. Since Pope Urban II had taken Crusaders' "houses, families, and all their goods into the protection of Saint Peter and the Roman church", and both Hugh and Rotrou were veterans of the First Crusade, the dispute was intractable. Bishop and lawyer Ivo of Chartres could not resolve it, since it involved a judicial duel, over which the church was not allowed to preside, and so remitted it to the court of the County of Blois. There Hugh lost, but in the violence that followed his tenant, who held the land from him as a fief, was captured by Rotrou's men. The reigning pope, Paschal II, who was in Chartres in April, sent the case back to Ivo, who complained in a letter that since "this law of the Church protecting the goods of knights going to Jerusalem was new. . . they did not know whether the protection applied only to their properties or also applied to their fortifications." Rotrou denied that the case had anything to do with the novel canon law.

== Norman politics ==
During Rotrou's absence his father, Geoffrey of Perche, died in 1099. On the first Sunday after returning to France, Rotrou paid a visit to the monastery of Nogent-le-Rotrou, a foundation of his family's and the location of his father tomb. There he asked to become a confrater (brother) of the Abbey of Cluny, Nogent's mother house, and to show his sincerity and prove the fulfillment of his crusading vow he placed a charter confirming his predecessors' donations to the abbey and the palm frond brought back from Jerusalem on the altar.

Rotrou's position in the Duchy of Normandy was that of defender of the frontier with the Île-de-France. His position was probably enhanced by his participation in the First Crusade. Whereas his father had only held the title of viscount, Rotrou is usually called a count. In the war between Henry I of England and Robert Curthose, Rotrou sided with the former and was an important figure in Henry's administration of the duchy after the capture of Robert at Tinchebrai in 1106. Rotrou was a direct vassal of Henry in England, where he held fiefs jure uxoris, in right of his wife, the king's daughter Matilda. He was not often in England, but is purported to have been close to his wife.

== Reconquista ==
=== Early participation ===
Rotrou's actual first participation in the Reconquista dates to the first decade of the twelfth century (possibly 1104–5). He and a group of Normans are said to have fought the Muslims in the service of Alfonso the Battler, then King of Aragon and Navarre, until the Aragonese plotted against them and they returned home. It has been speculated that the Norman involvement in the campaign originated as gossip designed to discredit Alfonso by Cluny, an ally of Alfonso's rival, Alfonso VI of Castile. More probably the Normans just accomplished too little to be noticed, or were perhaps sent back home without encountering any Muslims because their services were not need at the time, when Alfonso the Battler had an alliance with the taifa (faction-kingdom) of Zaragoza. Perhaps the 'Aragonese plot' originated as a rumour with dissatisfied returning Normans.

After the death of his wife, eldest son and two of his nephews in the wreck of the White Ship (1120), Rotrou returned to Spain. His parting may have been an act of penitence (perhaps he believed his sins had brought on the tragedy), or perhaps a public demonstration of grieving, since his wife was a daughter of the king, who had also lost his heir, William Adelin, in the wreck. According to the Chronicle of San Juan de la Peña, Rotrou took part in the conquests of Zaragoza (1118) and Tudela (1119), but this account has been shown to be apocryphal. Many French barons can be connected with the expedition against Zaragoza, but although his Anales de la Corona de Aragón name Rotrou as fighting under Alfonso of Aragon on several occasions, Jerónimo Zurita does not mention him by name when recording the call for transpyrenean assistance put out by the Battler. Likewise Rotrou is attested fighting for Henry I in Normandy in 1119 and so could not have had any hand in the conquest of Tudela, although the Chronicle of San Juan makes him out to be the chief conqueror and the first and independent ruler of the town. Neither is he mentioned in the charter of surrender of Tudela.

=== Rule of Tudela ===
Rotrou was still in Normandy in 1120 when he signed the reconfirmation act of the abbey of Arcisses. Since he received land in Zaragoza after the conquest, it might be assumed that he sent either money or men to assist in the enterprise. He did not sign the city's fueros, which the nobles of southern France who had participated in its conquest did. He had arrived in Aragon by 1123, perhaps as early as 1121. His first participation was probably in the campaign against Lleida. An Aragonese charter dating to April 1123 refers to Rotrou as "count in Tudela", although it does not specifically refer to him as the ruler of the place. The Norman lord Robert Burdet, who later held the Tarragona as a principality, may originally have fought alongside Rotrou in Normandy and then followed him to Spain c.1123. Robert is first mentioned in a charter issued by Rotrou in Spain, in which the count granted some houses in Zaragoza to a knight of his named Sabino in gratitude for his services (December 1124). There is a slightly later reference which shows that Rotrou was in control of Tudela and that he had appointed Robert to act as his alcalde (mayor) or military commander of the citadel and one Duran Pixon to act as administrator (justiciar). This charter also affirms, against the Chronicle of San Juan, that Rotrou ruled Tudela as a vassal of Alfonso the Battler, who is called "emperor" in the document. Similar charters from February 1128 and November 1131 show that this arrangement continued for almost a decade, even though Rotrou was often absent in Normandy and Robert Burdet in Tarragona. When Alfonso granted fueros to Tudela in 1127 he also mentioned Rotrou, Robert and Duran. It has been suggested that Rotrou's rise to an important frontier post in a city in whose conquest he played no role was either recompense for the mistreatment he received in the first decade of the century or due to the deterrent effect of his private army of Normans on the neighbouring Muslims.

In the winter of 1124–25, Rotrou led an expedition against the hilltop Muslim fortress of Peña Cadiella (Benicadell), which guarded the road from Alicante to Valencia. Since Muslim troops from Murcia often moved up this road to Valencia, it was of great strategic importance for any planned campaign in eastern al-Andalus. Rotrou's expedition, which had royal approval, may have been planned in conjunction with Alfonso's Andalusian expedition that took place in 1127–28. Rotrou was assisted in his endeavour by the Aragonese knights of the Confraternity of Belchite and their master, Galindo Sánchez. Rotrou returned to Normandy with his retinue in 1125, leaving Robert Burdet in command of Tudela (where he is attested in charters from 1126 through 1128). Rotrou did not participate in Alfonso's Andalusian campaign, and a rumour in Normandy claimed that Alfonso made his war out of envy for Rotrou's achievements.

Rotrou returned to Alfonso the Battler in 1130, when he was at the Siege of Bayonne. On 26 October, from the siege, Alfonso granted the fuero previously given to Tudela to the small town of Corella. Rotrou was one of the signatories, since the castle of Corella had been granted to him by the king in December 1128. He is last attested as ruler in Tudela with Robert as his underling in a private act of November 1131. He was still in Iberia in March 1132, when he witnessed Alfonso's grant of a fuero to the town of Asín.

== Second trip to the Holy Land ==
Sometime before 1144, Rotrou returned to the Mideast on Crusade, one of the few north French barons to do so. On this second trip Rotrou obtained some relics which he donated to the monastery he had founded at La Trappe.

In Spain, Rotrou established links with García Ramírez, the future king of Navarre. García married Margaret of L'Aigle, daughter of Rotrou's sister Juliana. Margaret's daughter Margaret, married William I of Sicily and raised to the chancellorship her cousin Stephen du Perche, a younger and illegitimate son of Rotrou. She also made Gilbert, another cousin from the Perche, count in Gravina. This Gilbert was one of Rotrou's grandsons, although by which son is not known. Another relation, Henry of Montescaglioso, was a son of Margaret, perhaps illegitimate.

== Family ==
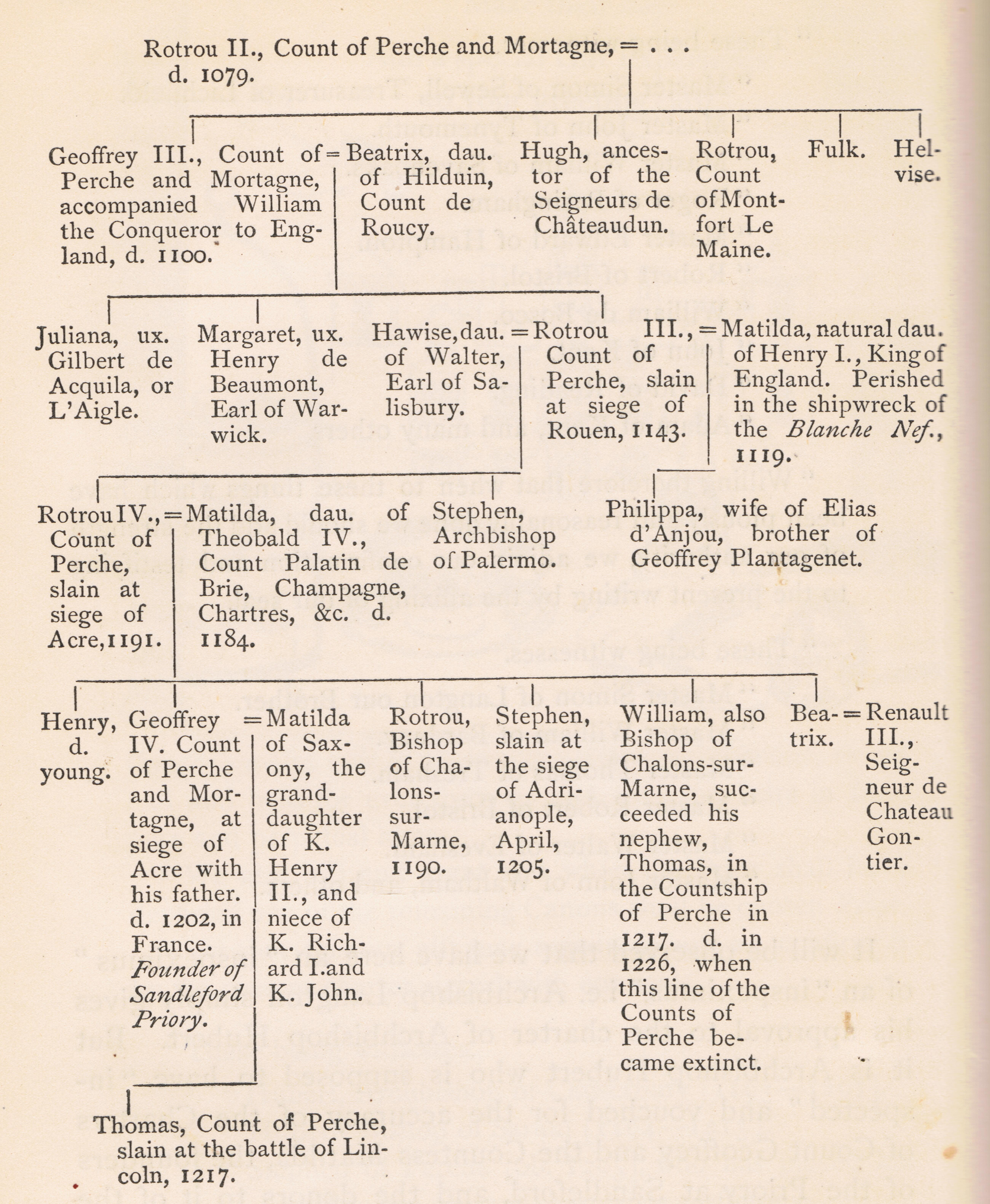
Possible family tree of the counts of Perche.

Rotrou's first wife's name is unknown. They had one daughter:

- Beatrix, married Renaud IV, lord of Château-Gontier

Rotrou's second wife was Matilda, illegitimate daughter of Henry I of England and one of his many mistresses, Edith. Matilda drowned in the wreck of the White Ship on 25 November 1120. They had two daughters:

- Philippa, married Elias II, Count of Maine
- Felicia

Rotrou's third wife was Hawise, daughter of Walter of Salisbury and sister of Patrick, Earl of Salisbury. They had:

- Rotrou IV, killed at the Siege of Acre
- Geoffrey (died after 1154)
- Stephen, Archbishop of Palermo

Rotrou also had an illegitimate son by an unknown mistress:

- Bertrand, father of Gilbert, Count of Gravina

Rotrou was succeeded as Count of Perche by his son of the same name.

== Sources ==
- Civel, Nicolas (2006). La fleur de France: les seigneurs d'Ile-de-France au XIIe siècle (in French). Brepols.
- Thompson, Kathleen (1998). "Family Tradition and the Crusading Impulse: The Rotrou Counts of the Perche". Medieval Prosopography. 19: 1–33.
- Thompson, Kathleen (2002). Power and Border Lordship in Medieval France: The County of Perche. Boydell & Brewer.

French nobility
Preceded by Geoffrey II	Count of Perche; 1099–1144	Succeeded by Rotrou IV
