= Santo Spirito, Palermo =

Norman church in Palermo, Italy

Church of the Holy Spirit
- Chiesa del Santo Spirito (in Italian)
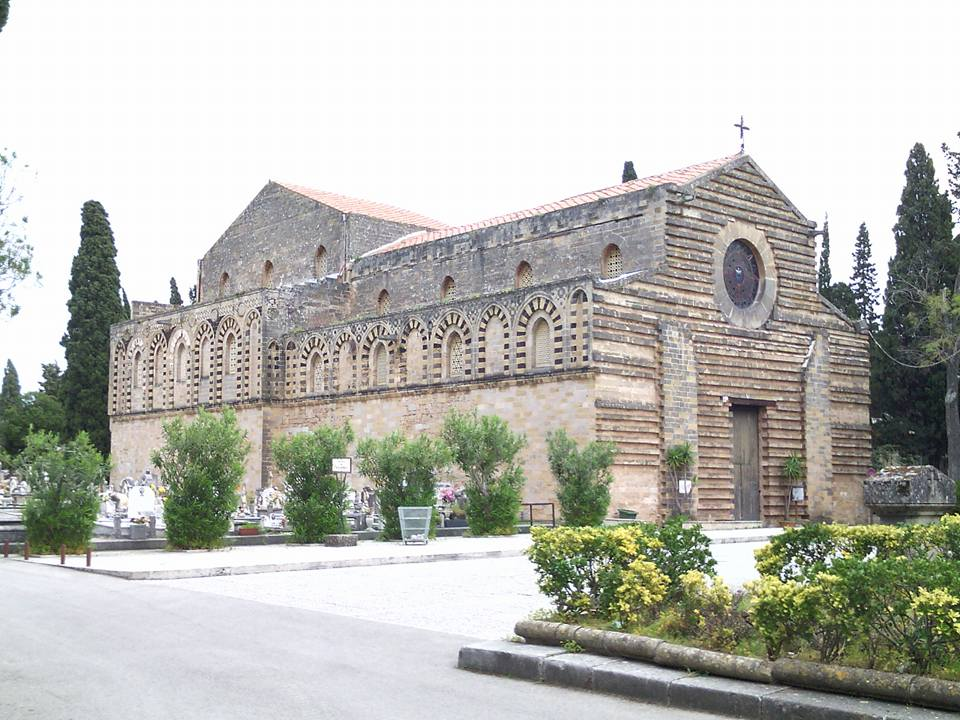
- Exterior of the church

Religion
- Affiliation: Roman Catholic
- Province: Archdiocese of Palermo
- Rite: Roman Rite

Location
- Location: Palermo, Italy
- Interactive map of Church of the Holy Spirit
- Coordinates: 38°05′57″N 13°21′46.52″E

Architecture
- Style: Arab-Norman, Gothic
- Groundbreaking: 1173
- Completed: 1178

The Church of the Holy Spirit (Italian: Chiesa dello Spirito Santo) is a Norman church in Palermo, Sicily, Southern Italy. The church is located within the boundaries of Sant'Orsola cemetery.

== History ==
The church was founded between 1173 and 1178 by the archbishop of Palermo, Walter of the Mill. The cloister(now lost) was built along the south side for the Cistercian monks. Walter initially entrusted it to the monks of the Calabrese Abbey of Sambucina. Considerable donations of King William II of Sicily and his mother, Margaret, enriched the monastery's property.

On March 30, 1282, it was in front of this church that the popular insurrection, later named the Sicilian Vespers, exploded.

== Sources ==
- Johnson, Mark J. (2012). "Church Building and Miracles in Norman Italy: Texts and Topoi". In Ćurčić, Slobodan (ed.). Approaches to Byzantine Architecture and Its Decoration: Studies in Honor of Slobodan Ćurčić. Ashgate Publishing Limited. ISBN 9781409427407.
- Setton, Kenneth Meyer (1976). The Papacy and the Levant, 1204-1571. Vol. 1: The thirteenth and fourteenth centuries. The American Philosophical Society.
- White, Lynn Townsend (1938). Latin Monasticism in Norman Sicily. Mediaeval Academy of America.
- Zorić, V. (1998). "Palermo". Enciclopedia dell’Arte Medievale (in Italian). Istituto della Enciclopedia Italiana.
