= Gilbert of Gravina =

Gilbert was a Hispano-Norman nobleman who was Count of Gravina from around 1159 and, during the regency of Margaret of Navarre, also count of Loritello and royal master captain or great constable in Apulia and the Terra di Lavoro until his exile in 1168. His father Bertram was the illegitimate son of Count Rotrou II of Perche. Through Queen Margaret's maternal kin, Gilbert was a distant but genuine relative of Margaret of Navarre, the queen of Sicily.

Gilbert arrived in Sicily from Spain sometime around 1159, summoned by William I to take the comital position of Gravina. Gravina, however, had already been raised to comital rank before Gilbert's arrival, probably after the extinction of the line of the sons of Boniface of Gravina, and Gilbert should not be regarded as the founder of the county.

Late in that same year, Gilbert joined a conspiracy of nobles, including Richard of Aquila, Roger of Acerra, and Bohemond of Tarsia, Count of Manoppello. The conspiracy was not merely of minor lords, but part of a wider coalition of counts and barons against the Sicilian regime. The aim of the conspirators was to assassinate Maio of Bari and in this they succeeded on 10 November 1160. The rebellion which followed was short-lived in Sicily, and Gilbert was one of the barons restored to favour, along with Bohemond.

However, on the peninsula, the rebels, led by Andrew of Rupecanina, Robert of Loritello and Tancred of Lecce, marched on Butera and burned it. Gilbert was later restored to favour, probably through Margaret's intervention, and eventually emerged as both a leading count and the king's chief man on the mainland. By the end of 1162, after the defeat and exile of Robert of Loritello and the other major rebels, he had become the royal magister comestabulus and the most powerful commander on the peninsula, combining comital lordship with continuing oversight for royal government in Apulia. Gilbert held the mainland for the king during the final stages of the revolt.

Gilbert took advantage of the death of William in 1166 to pressure his cousin, the regent, into giving him a higher position at court. According to Hugo Falcandus, Gilbert wanted to be appointed "master captain of the whole kingdom" and to direct the business of the curia immediately after the queen. The barons and the nobles who held estates or feuda reportedly preferred Gilbert at the head of the court, while the salaried knights and Richard of Mandra favoured the caïd Peter. Peter fled Sicily and reconverted to Islam. Margaret, however, refused to subordinate Peter to Gilbert, and instead sent Gilbert back to the mainland as captain of Apulia and the Terra di Lavoro, while making Richard of Mandra count of Molise and one of the leading familiares of the curia. At the same time Gilbert's son Bertram was granted the county of Andria, and Gilbert himself was later also granted the county of Loritello, so that he became the strongest mainland magnate of the regency and the de facto governor of Apulia and the Terra di Lavoro.

The year 1167 also saw Frederick Barbarossa campaigning in central Italy. According to Pseudo-Falcandus, a false letter announcing a German invasion provided the queen with a plausible justification to dispatch Gilbert to the peninsula as captain of Apulia and the Terra di Lavoro. Gilbert's command, together with Bertram's appointment to Andria, created a substantial block of lordships extending across the Adriatic line and the Terra di Bari.

The year 1166 also saw the arrival of Henry of Montescaglioso, Margaret's brother and Gilbert's kinsman, from Navarre. He was sent to Apulia with the title of Count of Montescaglioso and there he stayed briefly with Gilbert.

Later in 1167, an uncle of Gilbert's, Stephen du Perche, chancellor and Archbishop of Palermo, who had visited Gravina earlier, secretly sent for Gilbert's army to support him at Messina. Gilbert came with one hundred of the best-known knights of Apulia and the Terra di Lavoro; Romuald of Salerno likewise remembered him as arriving with a large force of knights. At a council in Messina, Henry of Montescaglioso was accused by Gilbert of conspiring against the chancellor. Evidence of a confession was duly provided and the Navarrese count was imprisoned in Reggio Calabria. Gilbert did not stand alone in his effort to ruin Richard of Mandra: Bohemond II of Tarsia and Robert of Caserta also testified against the count of Molise. Gilbert then left with his army; but Messina was in an uproar.

Messina revolted and freed the imprisoned Count Henry. The insurrection spread and the people of Palermo forced the removal of Stephen du Perche. This accomplished, an interim council was set up to assist the regent. Under the new administration imposed by Henry of Montescaglioso and Richard of Mandra, Gilbert's dominance came to an end. By then he was count of Gravina and Loritello, while his son Bertram was count of Andria. Gilbert retreated with his wife to a fortress, but most of the knights of the mainland deserted him when the curia's order was transmitted through the peninsular military structure. He eventually submitted himself and his goods to Richard of Fondi on terms allowing him to cross to the Syrian lands with his wife and children. The council exiled Gilbert and he joined Stephen on crusade, taking his wife and son, Bertram of Andria, with him.

== Sources ==
- Falcando, Ugo (1998). The History of the Tyrants of Sicily by "Hugo Falcandus," 1154-69. Translated by Loud, G.A.; Wiedemann, Thomas. Manchester University Press.
- Fernández-Aceves, Hervin. County and Nobility in Norman Italy: Aristocratic Agency in the Kingdom of Sicily, 1130–1189. Bloomsbury Academic: London and New York, 2020.
- Norwich, John Julius. The Kingdom in the Sun 1130-1194. Longman: London, 1970.
- History of the Tyrants of Sicily at Patrologia Latina.
