= Rotrou (archbishop of Rouen) =

Archbishop of Rouen

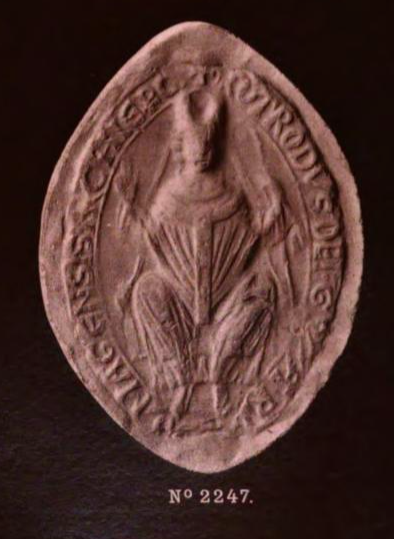
Rotrou's archiepiscopal seal

Rotrou or Rotrodus or Rotrode or Rothrud (died c. 27 November 1183) was the bishop of Évreux from 1140 and twenty-fifth archbishop of Rouen from 1165, a year after the death of Archbishop Hugh IV, until his own death in either 1183 or 1184. He was the fourth son of Henry de Beaumont, 1st Earl of Warwick, and Margaret, daughter of Geoffrey II of Perche. He was also the chief justiciar and steward of Normandy.

In 1167 he led the funeral service of Empress Matilda, daughter of Henry I and mother of Henry II, at Bec Abbey in Normandy.

He has a place in the history of the Kingdom of Sicily through his cousin, the queen regent Margaret of Navarre, who was the daughter of Marguerite de l'Aigle, daughter of Julienne, another daughter of Geoffrey of Perche. Margaret wrote him a letter beseeching him to send a relative of theirs to Sicily to assist her in the government. The man Rotrou sent was Stephen du Perche, later archbishop of Palermo. Rotrou also later sent Walter of the Mill, also later an archbishop of Palermo, to Sicily to be a tutor to William II of Sicily. Rotrou also escorted an embassy of William's to London and back to France with Joanna, daughter of Henry II of England, betrothed to William.

His successor was Gautier de Coutances, the companion of Richard the Lionheart.

== Sources ==
- Beaumont, Edward T. The Beaumonts in History. AD 850-1850. Oxford.
- Norwich, John Julius. The Kingdom in the Sun 1130-1194. Longman: London, 1970.
