= Ahmed es-Sikeli =

Ahmed es-Sikeli (Arabic: أَحْمَد الصِّقِلِّي, romanized: ʾAḥmad aṣ-ṣiqillī, lit. 'Ahmed the Sicilian'), baptised a Christian under the name Peter, was a eunuch and kaid of the Diwan of the Kingdom of Sicily during the reign of William I. His story was recorded by his Christian contemporaries Romuald Guarna and Hugo Falcandus from Sicily and the Muslim historian Ibn Khaldun.

Peter was born a Muslim in Djerba to a Berber family of the Sadwikish tribe. After his conversion he entered the service of the Sicilian crown and rose to the rank of admiral in the navy. During the reconquest of Roger I's "Kingdom of Africa" by the Muslims (1159), Peter led 160 ships in a raiding expedition to the Muslim-held Balearic Islands. He later tried to relieve besieged Mahdia in North Africa with the same fleet, but soon after engaging in battle he turned around and retreated towards Sicily. While Arabic sources credit a gale with dispersing the fleet, Hugo Falcandus asserts that Peter was "only in name and dress a Christian, and a Saracen at heart". Falcandus' assertion can probably be discredited, at least with respect to this point in Peter's life, for the admiral did not fall out of favour at court. In fact, he was promoted to the office of Great Chamberlain.

In 1162, Peter replaced the deceased Count Sylvester of Marsico in the triumvirate of officials—including Matthew of Ajello and Richard Palmer—in whom the king had confided the administration of the realm since the assassination of his prime minister, Maio of Bari, in 1160. On her husband's death in 1166, the queen dowager Margaret of Navarre assumed the regency for her young son William II. She trusted neither the nobility nor the church and so turned to the palatine officials and the triumvirs, of which she did not trust Matthew of Ajello. She promoted the chief eunuch, Peter, to the highest post in the kingdom, the one formerly held by Maio of Bari, but did not grant him the latter's title "emir of emirs" (ammiratus ammiratorum).

Peter was despised by the nobility and soon the Queen's cousin, Gilbert, Count of Gravina, was plotting against his life. Unable either to keep control of Sicily or to control Gilbert, Peter initially strengthened his bodyguard and eventually absconded, taking with him a quantity of treasure and severely embarrassing the Queen-regent. Re-assuming his birth name of Ahmed and practising Islam, he crossed to Africa and became a captain of the fleet of the Almohad caliph Yusuf I. According to Ibn Khaldun, who calls him Ahmed es-Sikeli ("Ahmed the Sicilian"), he fought with valour against Christian foes.
