= Gentile (bishop of Agrigento) =

Gentile (or Gentilis) (died 1171) was the bishop of Agrigento in Sicily from 1154 to his death. He has been described as a prélat aventureux et vagabond, an "adventurous and vagabond prelate" (Chalandon 1907).

A Tuscan by birth, he originally served as an ambassador from Géza II of Hungary, but decided to remain in Sicily after a diplomatic mission. There he became bishop of Agrigento and a noted courtier. Noted, that is, for his luxury and debauchery. He threw lavish banquets, which he used to begin a whispering campaign against Richard Palmer, Bishop of Syracuse, a rival candidate for the vacant archbishopric of Palermo (1166). Ironically, he complained of the Syracusan bishops foreign, English origins. Likewise, he convinced the Grand Protonotary Matthew of Ajello that Palmer was planning to kill him and very nearly started a blood feud.

The archbishopric was filled by Stephen du Perche, also a foreigner, and Gentile was the first ecclesiastic to join the large conspiracy against him. Nevertheless, Gentile swore an oath of fealty to Stephen just before the latter moved the court to Messina, where the conspiracy was uncovered and the "leader" of the group, Henry, Count of Montescaglioso, arrested and imprisoned. Gentile himself had avoided the court proceedings, but hurried with Matthew of Ajello back to Palermo to await Stephen's return. Once again, the conspiracy was uncovered and Gentile fled to his diocese, where the people handed him over to a royal justiciar come to arrest him. The bishop was imprisoned in San Marco d'Alunzio, the first Norman fortress on the island.

On Stephen's fall later in 1168, Gentile was released and was a guarantor of the deal whereby Stephen's life was spared should he immediately leave Sicily, which he did. The "old voluptuary", as Norwich calls him, was passed over again for the vacant archdiocese, Walter of the Mill being elected instead. Nonetheless, Gentile's penchant for conspiracy and sedition had apparently been satisfied and he took no part in any more such quarrels, dying early in 1171 and succeeded by Bartholomew.
