= Richard, Count of Molise =

Norman nobleman

Richard of Mandra (died ca. 1170) was a Norman nobleman in the Kingdom of Sicily appointed count of Molise and chancellor by the queen regent Margaret of Navarre.

Richard was son of Hugues II, Count of Molise and Clemenza, an illegitimate daughter of Roger II of Sicily.

In 1157, as the constable of Robert II of Bassunvilla, he was captured by King William I. He joined the conspiracy of Matthew Bonnellus in 1161, but when Simon of Taranto and Tancred of Lecce assaulted the palace and William was arrested, Richard put his body between certain especially violent knights and saved the king's life. For this, he was rewarded when the rebellion collapsed. On William's death in 1166, the queen, Margaret, took up the regency for the young William II. She gave him the old and important county of Molise and the chancellery because she trusted his loyalty to the royal family.

In 1167, he was accused of having an affair with the queen, who was clearly infatuated with him. However, these claims were probably intended by his enemies solely to provoke the queen's brother, Henry, Count of Montescaglioso, into acting against Richard. In that year, however, Margaret replaced him as chancellor with Stephen du Perche.

In 1168, Bohemond of Tarsia accused Richard of conspiracy against the new chancellor. A duel was scheduled when Count Robert of Caserta came forward with a second accusation. It was alleged that the Apulian town of Mandra among others near Troia were unlawfully obtained from the crown. A jury of his peers was assembled and found him guilty of illegally retaining the lands after the flight of the caïd Peter. He was dispossessed of all his lands and when he complained to the king he was imprisoned. It is likely that the whole trial was engineered by Gilbert, Count of Gravina, a political opponent of Richard's. After being accused of plotting against the king he was also blinded. But after his death his son Roger was still allowed to inherit him as Count of Molise.

== Sources ==
- Norwich, John Julius. The Kingdom in the Sun 1130-1194. Longman: London, 1970.
- Matthew, Donald. The Norman Kingdom of Sicily. Cambridge University Press: 1992.
