= Richard II (disambiguation) =

Richard II of England (1367–1400) was King of England from 1377 until he was deposed on 30 September 1399.

Richard II may also refer to:

== People ==
- Richard II of Normandy (c. 980–1026)
- Richard II (archbishop of Bourges) (r. 1071–1093)
- Richard II of Aquila (fl. 1156)
- Richard II of Capua (died 1105/1106)
- Richard II of Gaeta (died 1111)
- Richard II de Montfaucon (died 1162)
- Richard II of Beaumont (died 1242)
- Richard II de Bermingham (died 1580), Anglo-Irish lord
- Richard II van Orley (1663–1732), Flemish painter, draughtsman, printmaker
- Richard M. Daley or Richard II (born 1942), mayor of Chicago, Illinois

== Other uses ==
- Richard II (play), a play by William Shakespeare
  - "King Richard the Second", a 1978 episode of BBC Television Shakespeare
  - Richard II (The Hollow Crown), an episode of the British television series The Hollow Crown
- Thomas of Woodstock (play) or Richard II, Part One, a 1590s play treating events prior to Shakespeare's play
