= Gualterus Anglicus =

Anglo-Norman poet and scribe

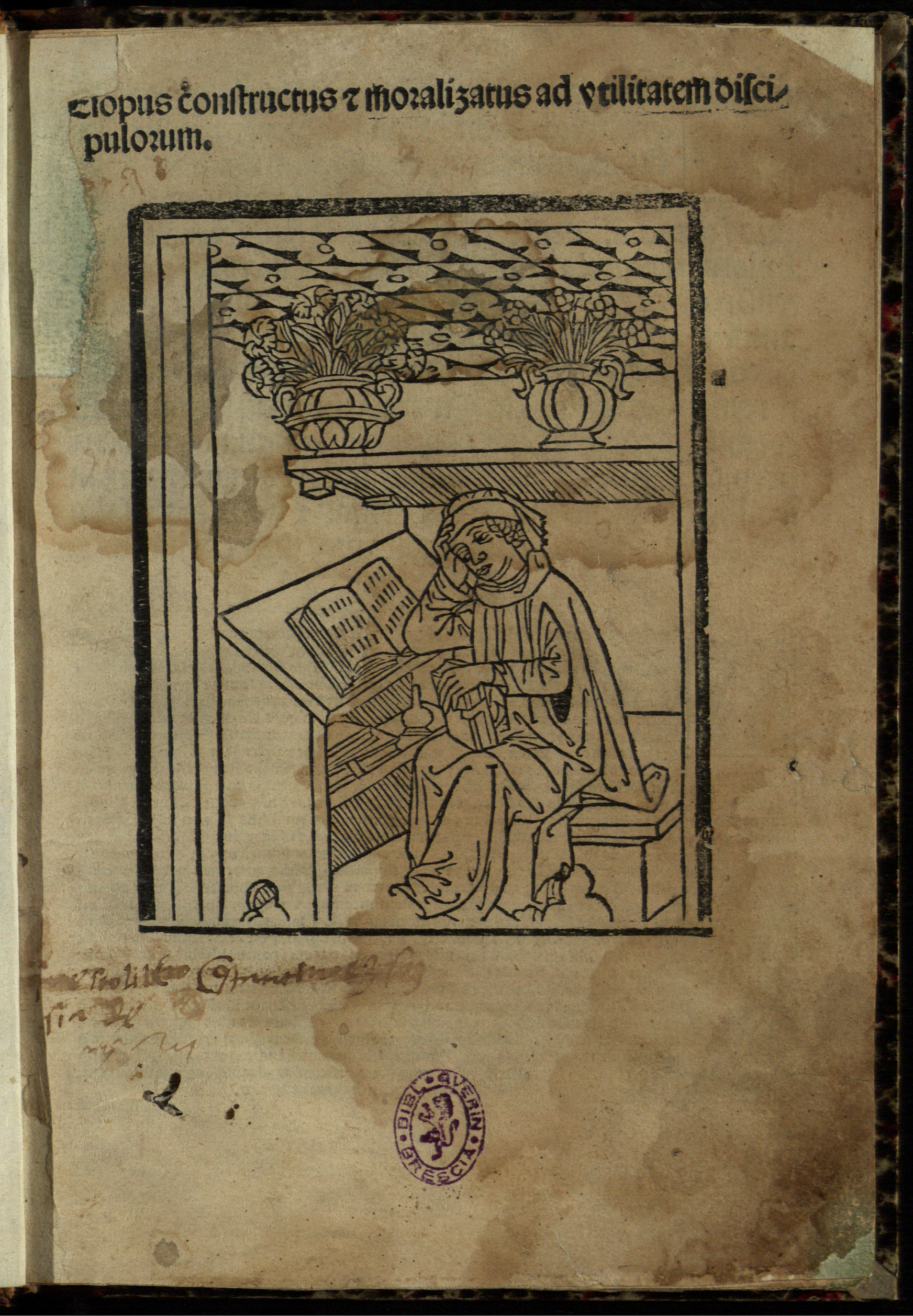
Aesopus constructus etc., 1495 edition with metrical version of Fabulae Lib. I-IV by Anonymus Neveleti

Gualterus Anglicus (Medieval Latin for Walter the Englishman) was an Anglo-Norman poet and scribe who produced a seminal version of Aesop's Fables (in distichs) around the year 1175.

== Identification of the author ==
This author was earlier called the Anonymus Neveleti, referring to attribution in the seventeenth-century Mythologia Aesopica of Isaac Nicholas Nevelet. The name Walter (Latin Gualterus) was produced by Léopold Hervieux, on the basis of manuscript evidence, and he went on to identify the author as Walter of the Mill, archbishop of Palermo from 1168 onwards. Scholars have disputed this second step of identification; it may no longer be supported. The entire attribution is attacked.

== The collection and its influence ==
This collection of 62 fables is more accurately called the verse Romulus, or elegiac Romulus (from its elegiac couplets). Given the uncertainty over the authorship, these terms are used in scholarly works.

There is an earlier prose version of Romulus, also; it has been dated as early as the tenth century, or the sixth century. It is adapted from Phaedrus; the initial fable "The Cock and the Jewel", supposedly the reply of Phaedrus to his critics, marks out fable collections originating from this source. Walter changed the "jewel" from a pearl to jasper.

The verse Romulus formed the mainstream versions of medieval 'Aesop'. It is thought to be the version used by Dante. It with Ovid influenced the Doligamus of Adolphus of Vienna.

When John Lydgate produced Isopes Fabules, the first fable collection written in English, the verse Romulus was a major source. Particularly sophisticated use of this fable tradition is made later in the 15th century in Robert Henryson's Morall Fabillis, written in Scots.

Early printed editions appeared under the title Aesopus moralisatus, around 1500.
