= Henry, Count of Montescaglioso =

Sicilian Nobleman

The Kingdom of Sicily as it was in Henry's time.

Henry (c. 1135 – c. 1175), born Rodrigo according to Hugo Falcandus, was an alleged son of the Navarrese king García Ramírez and his wife, Margaret of L'Aigle, and brother of the Sicilian queen dowager Margaret, who made him Count of Montescaglioso (1166) and then Prince of Taranto (1168).

== Arrival in Sicily (1166) ==
The main primary source for Henry's life is the Sicilian court chronicler known as Hugo Falcandus. He is an extremely unfriendly source to Henry. He reports the rumour that Henry was never acknowledged as a son by the Navarrese king and was considered a bastard, the product of one of the queen's affairs. This is contradicted by the actions of his sister, who always treated him as a full brother of royal blood. Henry's birth name, also, is evidence of legitimacy, for he was probably named after King García's illustrious grandfather, Rodrigo Díaz de Vivar, known as El Cid. Falcandus sums up Henry's appearance (short and swarthy) and character thus:

This Henry was low in stature, had a thin beard and a disagreeably dark complexion. He was rash and maladroit in conversation, a man interested only by dice and gambling, and he had no other desire than to have a playmate and money to lose.

Upon his arrival in Sicily Margaret made him change his name from Rodrigo (Latin Rodericus), which sounded strange to the local nobility, to the more palatable Henry (Latin Henricus).

Henry arrived in the kingdom of Sicily between May and September 1166. His sister had been, since the death of her husband, William I of Sicily, regent in the name of her young son, William II. In May or a short time after, perhaps before his arrival, he was married to an illegitimate daughter of Roger II and thus his sister's sister-in-law. On this occasion he was invested with Montescaglioso on the mainland, probably to keep him out of court politics. He was also given the fiefs of Noto, Sclafani and Caltanissetta on the island, territories which had been governed by Geoffrey, the previous Count of Montescaglioso, before his imprisonment for taking part in the rebellion of 1155–56.

Henry first paid a visit to Palermo, the capital and the location of his nephew's court. There "he would spend wildly, with neither forethought nor consideration" and squander his money, creating such a poor reputation that he was forced to leave for Messina on the opposite end of the island. There too he gambled and fell in with criminals, so that the queen was forced to order him to leave the island and go to Montescaglioso.

== First revolt and imprisonment (1167–68) ==
In the summer of 1167, Henry returned to Palermo in order to obtain a part in the government of the whole kingdom. According to Falcandus, he went at the instigation of his friends, who thought that he, as a royal prince, deserved the highest secular office, the chancellorship, then occupied by Richard, Count of Molise. By the summer Stephen du Perche, his and Margaret's cousin, had replaced Richard. Stephen quickly befriended Henry, but some "Spanish knights" (milites hispanos), Henry's entourage who had travelled with him from Navarre, accused the chancellor of having an affair with the queen. Henry was not so easily persuaded, as Falcandus records:

He responded that he was ignorant of French, which was most necessary at court, and that his experience was not sufficient; that he should commit to the government of the chancellor, who was wise and prudent, as well as noble, despite his affair with the queen.

Stephen and Henry appear to have been the leaders, willingly or unwillingly, of two opposed court factions seeking to dominate the regency. Eventually the rumours of incest convinced the count of Montescaglioso to act. He initially accused the chancellor before the king, his nephew, but to no effect. Soon a conspiracy against the detested Stephen had drawn him in.

On 15 December 1167, when Stephen had the court moved temporarily to Messina, Henry remained at Palermo to lead the conspirators, whose ranks included Matthew of Ajello, the gaito or judge Richard and Bishop Gentile of Agrigento. When the court returned to Palermo shortly after 12 March 1168, its last session in Messina, Henry demanded, in council, the Principality of Taranto, which had been confiscated from Simon, an illegitimate son of Roger II, and all of Simon's other lands. Then, Gilbert, Count of Gravina, another cousin of Henry and Margaret, rose in council, denounced the count and accused him of treason. The charge was easily established, as Henry had admitted the conspiracy to a judge of Messina a short time before. He was promptly arrested and interned in Reggio di Calabria, while the "Spanish knights" who had accompanied him were given a day to leave Sicily, which they did.

== Second revolt (1168) ==
After Henry's imprisonment, Margaret offered him 1,000 gold ducats if he would return to Navarre and promise never to set foot in Sicily again. She assigned a certain French priest, Odo Quarrel, a canon of Chartres Cathedral who had come to Sicily in the following of Stephen du Perche, to escort Henry back to Navarre. He was in Messina, preparing seven galleys for the departure when, on 31 March, Easter Sunday, the Messinans, who despised the chancellor, revolted. Odo was captured and the galleys were commandeered across the strait to Reggio, where Henry was released upon their demand. The citizens rowed him back to Messina as the leader of a second insurrection against his cousin.

Henry's brief rule of Messina was marked by bloodshed. He unjailed Odo and handed him over to the people, who lynched him. He also failed to prevent a massacre of all the French in the city. He successfully worked to spread the rebellion, which was openly directed against the regime of the chancellor, throughout the island. By the summer Stephen was forced to go into exile. Henry returned triumphant to Palermo with twenty or twenty-four galleys. Richard, the count of Molise, disembarked with him. Historian John Norwich believed that Henry was offered a second sum of money by the queen to return to Navarre, which this time he accepted, but Norwich's assertion that he appears no more in Italian history is false.

== Rule of the Principate ==
In July 1168 Henry was invested with the Principate and formally made submission in order to obtain it. In a document dated 8 December he is titled "by the grace of God and the king Count of the Principate and brother of the Lady Queen Margaret". Henry only appears in two more documents, one of 1170, the other, his last appearance, of July 1173. He was dead by September 1177, when his widow is cited in a dating clause as regent in the Principate for her son, Henry's heir, William IV. She continued in the regency for almost two decades. Another charter of 1179 also mentions her husband. The first recorded instance of William ruling in his own right dates to April 1195.
