= Matthew Bonnellus =

Matthew Bonnellus (Italian: Matteo Bonello or Bonnel; c. 1130 – c. 1161) was a rich knight of an ancient and influential Norman family who became the lord of Caccamo in Sicily. He is most famous as the leader of three consecutive revolts against the ammiratus ammiratorum Maio of Bari and King William I of Sicily.

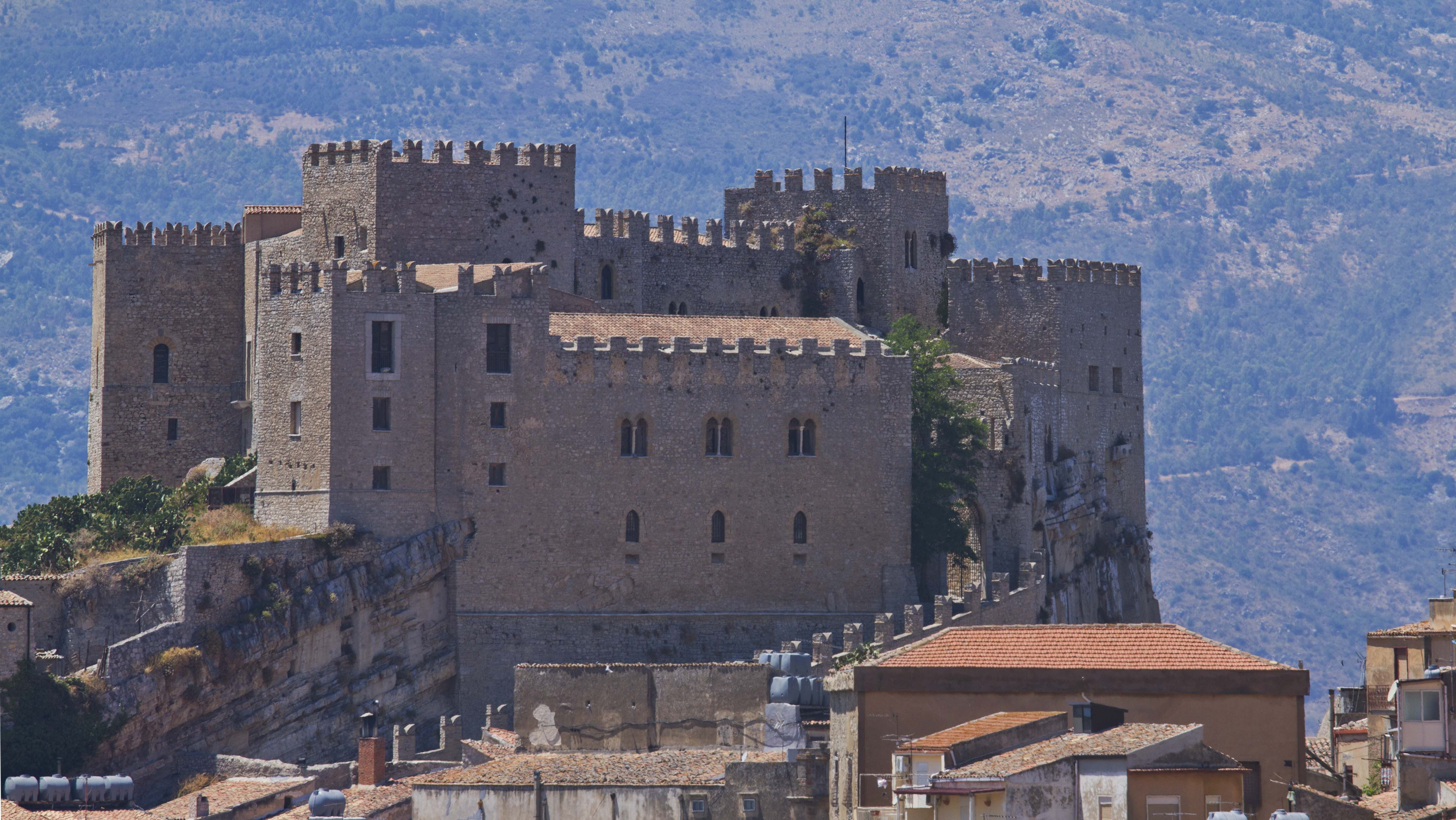
The Castello di Caccamo.

When young he was attached to Maio, who destined him to be his son-in-law, and sent him on a diplomatic mission to Calabria. While there, Bonnellus became romantically involved with Clementia, Countess of Catanzaro, the heiress of Count Robert of Catanzaro. In return for her hand in marriage, he was induced to join the brewing conspiracy bent on Maio's assassination. According to Hugo Falcandus, on 10 November 1160, rumours began circulating in Palermo that "the King was coming that night, at Maio's instigation, to the Archbishop's palace, and that there, in that very street, he was to be slain." It was not, however the king, but the admiral, who was to be slain: with the complicity of the Archbishop Hugh. Matthew of Ajello warned Maio, but it was of no use. For immediately upon hearing his name mentioned, Bonnellus leapt from his crevice and stabbed the admiral while his attendants fled.

Bonnellus himself fled to Caccamo, but his popularity in the streets of the capital was such that the king was forced to grant him a pardon and he reentered Palermo as a hero. Under the urging of Queen Margaret, however, the king was prompted to demand a long-overlooked duty, a payment owed by Bonnellus for his inheritance, of 60,000 taris. Bonnellus paid, but his enmity with the king grew and his fellow conspirators convinced him to move to assassinate William. This he did by purchasing the support of Simon, the bastard son of Roger II, and Tancred, Count of Lecce, the bastard grandson of Roger, both Hauteville claimants to the throne. With the help of the prisoners in the dungeon, Simon and Tancred stormed the palace and captured the king. Many courtiers were killed and an anti-Moslem pogrom began, only halted by the narrowness of the streets in the Moslem quarter. Bonnellus himself was out of Palermo and it was announced that Roger, William's eldest son of nine years, already duke of Apulia, would be crowned in William's stead. The conspirators paused to await Bonnellus' return and the city reacted against them. The king was freed and the leaders fled to Caccamo.

Bonnellus himself led the rebels out of Caccamo in an assault on Palermo. Once again, however, the insurrectionists paused and allowed the momentum to pass from them and their enemies to regroup. Reinforcements arrived from Messina and the rebels were forced to accept very generous terms: exile for all and pardon for Bonnellus himself. Bonnellus charged the king's ministers with various evils to justify his actions and so proved to the king that he would never be pacific. William imprisoned him in a dungeon in al-Halka and Palermo revolted. This time all captured rebels were executed or mutilated and Bonnellus was blinded and hamstrung. He died soon thereafter in prison. His fiancée Clementia was exiled from Palermo to Calabria.

== Sources ==
- Alio, Jacqueline. Margaret, Queen of Sicily. Trinacria: New York, 2017.
- Norwich, John Julius. The Kingdom in the Sun 1130-1194. Longman: London, 1970.
