= Stephen du Perche =

Chancellor of the Kingdom of Sicily from c. 1167 to 1168

Stephen du Perche (1137 or 1138 – 1169) was the chancellor of the Kingdom of Sicily from probably the summer of 1167 to 1168 and archbishop-elect of Palermo (1167–68) during the early regency of his cousin, the queen dowager Margaret of Navarre (1166–71). Recent scholarship has also placed his rise within a wider reconfiguration of power linking the Sicilian curia with mainland aristocratic offices and kin networks.

Stephen is described by the contemporary chronicler Hugo Falcandus as "a son of the count of Perche", Rotrou, count of Perche. He was a young man when he entered politics, born at the earliest in 1137 or 1138. He may have been named after King Stephen of England, at the time ruling the Duchy of Normandy. Through the family of Margaret of L'Aigle, Stephen was a cousin once removed of Queen Margaret and the paternal uncle of Gilbert, Count of Gravina, who would become one of his principal allies in Sicily.

== Arrival in Italy ==
In 1166, Margaret appealed to her other cousin, Rotrou, Archbishop of Rouen, to send her a family member to aid and support her in government. Coincidentally, Stephen was at that moment preparing to go on crusade to the Holy Land and so decided to visit Palermo, the capital of Sicily, for a few months. Older accounts placed his arrival in 1166, but recent research has shown that the supposed November 1166 charter for the monastery of St Mary of Nardò naming Stephen as chancellor is an eighteenth-century forgery; the surviving testimony of Hugo Falcandus and Romuald of Salerno instead indicates that he arrived in the kingdom in 1167. On his way to Sicily he stopped with Gilbert of Gravina, "his brother's son", who gave him gifts and briefed him on the state of affairs at court.

Stephen was very young at the time, described as puer and adolescens by William of Tyre, and may have still been in his teens. He was probably appointed chancellor in the summer of 1167. A second royal charter issued at Palermo in August 1167 has likewise been regarded as a probable falsification, but by November 1167 Stephen was certainly archbishop-elect of Palermo. According to Hugo Falcandus, Queen Margaret ordered that all the business of the curia should first be referred to Stephen, and Romuald later summarized his rise by saying that he had become so favoured and close to the queen and the young king that he "administered the whole kingdom as he wished". His appointment was resented by much of the local nobility. His chancellorship was noted, according to Hugo Falcandus, in that "he never allowed powerful men to oppress their subjects, nor ever feigned to overlook any injury done to the poor. In such a way his fame quickly spread throughout the Kingdom . . . so that men looked on him as a heaven-sent angel of consolation who had brought back the Golden Age". The opinion of Falcandus probably coincides better with that of the lower classes than Stephen's fellow aristocrats.

== Conflict with Matthew of Ajello ==
In 1167, Margaret had Stephen elected as archbishop of Palermo, the highest ecclesiastical office in the land. He was ordained by Romuald of Salerno only days before his elevation, and it deeply rankled the old noblesse. Romuald and Richard Palmer, bishop of Syracuse, both candidates for the vacant see of Palermo themselves, were strongly opposed. But Stephen's greatest opponent was Matthew of Ajello, a notary whom he had offended the year previous. Stephen went so far as to try and seize Matthew's mail, but nothing indicating conspiracy was ever proven against the notary. Stephen was never consecrated, perhaps because he had not attained the canonical age of thirty.

In that year as well, Henry, Count of Montescaglioso, the queen's brother, returned from the peninsula on the counsel of his friends, who had goaded him into making a complaint to his sister about the rank of Stephen. Stephen won Henry over, for a while, but rumours of an affair between Stephen and Margaret were enough to push him into a conspiracy. Most of the Muslim staff of the palace and the eunuchs were involved in the plots and, on 15 December, Stephen promptly moved the court to Messina, where he had implored his nephew Gilbert, Count of Gravina, then master captain of all Apulia, to go with an army. According to Falcandus, Gilbert brought with him one hundred of the best-known knights of Apulia and the Terra di Lavoro. The plotters, led by Matthew of Ajello and Gentile, Bishop of Agrigento, went to Messina, but Henry, for reasons unknown, gave them up to a local judge. At a meeting of the entire court, Gilbert accused Henry of treason and the latter was imprisoned in Reggio Calabria. By allowing Matthew to go free, however, Stephen prepared the way for future plots against his life.

== Deposition and exile by a conspiracy ==
In March 1168, Stephen and his entourage, including the king, William II, and queen regent, arrived in Palermo, where the conspirators had already arrived. This time, Matthew was imprisoned and Gentile fled. He was arrested in Agrigento. But, though the Arabs of Palermo had been soothed, the Messinan Greeks had been riled by the past months and a rebellion consequently broke out in that city (on account of the criminal practices of one of Stephen's friends, Odo Quarrel). There, a mob commandeered some ships and sailed to Reggio, there to force the release of Henry of Montescaglioso. After Henry's arrival in Messina, Odo was arrested and brutally executed and all the Frenchmen of the city massacred: an inglorious prelude to the more widespread Sicilian Vespers of 1282. Stephen prepared an army (largely of Lombards from the region of Etna) and was ready to march on Messina when the young king postponed the campaign on astrological grounds.

Matthew of Ajello, from prison, had organised the rebellion in Palermo and, seeing his opportunity, struck. And it was rumoured that William II was murdered and the chancellor planned to marry his brother to Princess Constance, who was confined to Santissimo Salvatore, Palermo as a nun from childhood due to a prediction that "her marriage would destroy Sicily", to claim the throne, despite the existence of Henry, younger brother of William. Modern scholarship has interpreted Stephen's fall not merely as a Palermo palace coup, but as the outcome of a broader aristocratic realignment in which newer counts such as Henry of Montescaglioso and Richard of Molise, together with established mainland nobles including Robert of Caserta and Roger of Avellino, combined to curb the concentration of power around Stephen and Gilbert of Gravina.

Stephen was finally forced to flee. The chancellor-archbishop took refuge in the campanile. There he held out until offered terms. In return for his safety, he agreed to embark at once for the Holy Land. He was deposed as archbishop and Walter of the Mill was elected to replace him. Gilbert of Gravina and his family were forced to do the same and they all left for the Kingdom of Jerusalem. Stephen's allies in Sicily had included not only transalpine followers but also local nobles such as Bohemund II of Tarsia, Carbonellus, and William of San Severino.

With Margaret's attempt to recall him in vain, he arrived in the Kingdom of Jerusalem and soon fell ill and died. According to William of Tyre, "he was buried with honour in Jerusalem in the chapter-house of the Temple of the Lord."

== Sources ==
- Fernández-Aceves, Hervin. County and Nobility in Norman Italy: Aristocratic Agency in the Kingdom of Sicily, 1130–1189. Bloomsbury Academic: London and New York, 2020.
- William of Tyre. Historia rerum in partibus transmarinis gestarum. at Patrologia Latina.
- Norwich, John Julius. The Kingdom in the Sun 1130–1194. Longman: London, 1970.
