= Joan of England, Queen of Sicily =

Queen of Sicily from 1177 to 1189

Joan of England
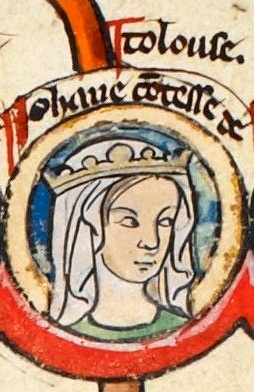

Queen consort of Sicily
- Tenure: 13 February 1177 – 11 November 1189
- Coronation: 13 February 1177

Countess consort of Toulouse
- Tenure: October 1196/7 – 4 September 1199
- Born: October 1165; Château d'Angers, Anjou
- Died: 4 September 1199 (aged 33); Rouen
- Burial: Fontevrault Abbey
- Spouses: William II, King of Sicily (m. 1177; died 1189): Raymond VI, Count of Toulouse (m. 1196)
- Issue: Raymond VII, Count of Toulouse; Joan of Toulouse; Richard of Toulouse
- House: Plantagenet-Angevin (Note: Historians are divided in their use of the terms Plantagenet and Angevin in regard to Henry II and his children. Some class Henry II to be the first Plantagenet king of England; others refer to Henry II, Richard I, and John as the Angevin dynasty, and consider Henry III to be the first Plantagenet ruler.)
- Father: Henry II, King of England
- Mother: Eleanor, Duchess of Aquitaine

Joan of England (October 1165 – 4 September 1199), also known as Joanna, was by marriage Queen of Sicily and Countess of Toulouse. She was the seventh child of King Henry II of England and Duchess Eleanor of Aquitaine. From her birth, she was destined to make a political and royal marriage. She married William II of Sicily and later Raymond VI, Count of Toulouse, two very important and powerful figures in the political landscape of medieval Europe.

== Early life ==
Joan was born in October 1165 at Château d'Angers in Anjou as the seventh child of Henry II, King of England and his queen consort, Eleanor of Aquitaine. As an infant, Joan travelled with her mother's household throughout France and England.

Much of Joan's childhood was spent at Fontevraud Abbey in Anjou, alongside her younger brother John. As a young Angevin princess, Joan's early education consisted of subjects to ready her for a dynastic marriage. She likely learned how to sew and weave, sing, play an instrument, and ride a horse – a pastime that she might have loved because she mentioned her horse in her will. She would certainly have learned to read Latin, Norman, and Occitan, and possibly also to write.

Joan was removed from Fontevraud by her father in 1174, in the aftermath of the Revolt of 1173–1174, and moved to Salisbury (and later Winchester) where her mother was under house arrest.

== Queen of Sicily ==
In 1176, William II of Sicily sent ambassadors to the English court to ask for Joan's hand in marriage. William sought to forge a marriage alliance with Henry II, who was at the time one of Europe's pre-eminent figures. Henry, in turn, likely saw an alliance with Sicily as useful for any future crusades. The betrothal was confirmed on 20 May, and Joan's father had to raise money to pay for the cost of the journey, wedding, and dowry. He did this by imposing a tax on English subjects.

In late August, Joan set sail for Sicily from Southampton, escorted by a delegation including Richard of Dover, Archbishop of Canterbury, Rotrou, Arrchbishop of Rouen, and her uncle, Hamelin de Warenne, Earl of Surrey. In the Angevin territories of northern France, she was met by her eldest brother Henry the Young King, and he escorted her to Poitiers to her brother Richard the Lionheart. He took her to the Mediterranean port of Saint Gilles, arriving in November. There, her entourage was met by a Sicilian fleet and entourage, including Richard Palmer, Bishop of Syracuse.

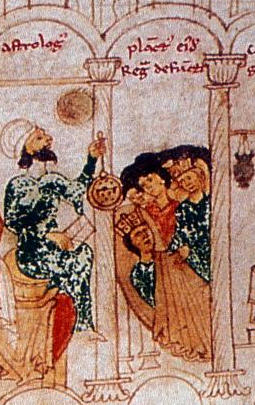
William II of Sicily’s death-bed

After six weeks at sea, Joan was deeply seasick, and the fleet put in at Naples to continue overland. They safely arrived at Zisa Palace in Palermo in late January, and on 13 February 1177, she married King William and was crowned Queen of Sicily at Palermo Cathedral.

Joan produced no surviving heir. Although there were rumours that she had given birth to a boy called Bohemond, in 1181 or 1182, he died in infancy if he did exist. Traditionally, a royal husband in such a situation may have annulled the marriage for a chance to marry a woman who would give him a son. King William did not annul the marriage, nor did he express any interest in doing so. Instead, he named his aunt Constance, daughter of Roger II of Sicily as his heir.

When William II died in November 1189, Sicily was seized by his bastard cousin Tancred, who took the lands given to Joan by William with the sound strategic reason that Monte Sant'Angelo lay on the route taken by the invading forces of Heinrich VI of Germany husband of Constance. He also put Joan under house arrest at Zisa, Palermo, in retaliation for her backing of Constance to inherit the throne.

== Third Crusade ==
Finally, her brother King Richard I of England arrived in Italy in 1190, on the way to the Holy Land. He demanded her return, along with every penny of her dowry. When Tancred balked at these demands, Richard seized a monastery and the castle of La Bagnara. He decided to spend the winter in Italy and attacked and subdued the city of Messina, Sicily. Finally, Tancred agreed to the terms and sent Joan's dowry. In March 1191 Eleanor of Aquitaine arrived in Messina with Richard's bride, Berengaria of Navarre.

Eleanor returned to England, leaving Berengaria in Joan's care. Richard decided to postpone his wedding, put his sister and bride on a ship, and set sail. Two days later the fleet was hit by a fierce storm, destroying several ships and blowing Joan and Berengaria's ship off course. Richard landed safely in Crete, but they were stranded near Cyprus. The self-appointed despot of Cyprus, Isaac Comnenus was about to capture them when Richard's fleet suddenly appeared. The princesses were saved, but the despot made off with Richard's treasure. Richard pursued and captured Isaac, threw him into a dungeon, married Berengaria on 12 May 1191 at Limasol, Cyprus and then sent Joan and Berengaria on to Acre.

Joan was Richard's favourite sister, but he was not above using her as a bargaining chip in his political schemes. He even suggested marrying her to Saladin's brother, Al-Adil, and making them joint rulers of Jerusalem. Although Al-Adil and Saladin both expressed agreement with the arrangement, the plan failed when the high-ranking priests opposed the wedding and threatened Richard that he would be excommunicated from the Catholic Church. King Philip II of France also expressed some interest in marrying her, but this scheme, too, failed (possibly on grounds of affinity, since Philip's father Louis VII had formerly been married to her mother).

== Countess of Toulouse ==
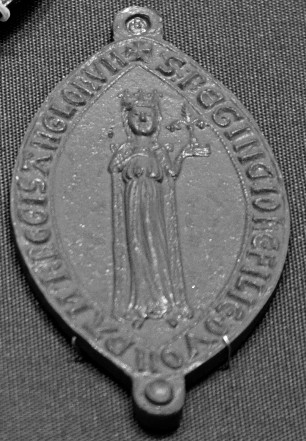
Joan's seal

Joan was married in October 1196, at Rouen to Raymond VI, Count of Toulouse, as his fourth wife, with Quercy and the Agenais as her dowry. She was the mother of his successor Raymond VII of Toulouse (born July 1197), and a daughter, Joan (born 1198), who married Bernard II de la Tour, Lord of la Tour.

Some chroniclers, who disliked Raymond VI, Count of Toulouse (believing he was a heretic), claim that his marriage to Joan quickly became unhappy, and that she had been fleeing to her brother Richard's domains in 1199, when she learned of Richard's death. "The Chronicle of Guillaume de Puylaurens", however, says the following of Joan's last few months: "She was an able woman of great spirit, and after she had recovered from childbed, she was determined to counter the injuries being inflicted upon her husband at the hands of numerous magnates and knights. She therefore took arms against the lords of Saint-Felix, and laid siege to a castrum belonging to them known as Les Cassés. Her efforts were of little avail; some of those with her treacherously and secretly provided arms and supplies to the besieged enemy. Greatly aggrieved, she abandoned the siege, and was almost prevented from leaving her camp by a fire started by the traitors. Much affected by this injury, she hastened to see her brother King Richard to tell him about it but found that he had died. She herself died, whilst pregnant, overcome by this double grief."

=== Death and burial ===
Joan asked to be admitted to Fontevrault Abbey, an unusual request for a married, pregnant woman, but this request was granted. She died in childbirth on 24 September 1199, and was veiled a nun on her deathbed. Her son lived just long enough to be baptised, receiving the name of Richard. Joan was thirty-three years old.

Joan was initially buried at Rouen Cathedral, but through her mother's influence was re-interred at Fontevrault Abbey. Her effigy was originally shown kneeling at the head of her father's tomb with her hands clasped and head bent in an attitude of devotion which was expressed on her face. Her eldest son, Raymond, was buried beside her and his effigy knelt facing hers. Both effigies were destroyed during the French Revolution.

== Historical sources ==
- Robert of Torigni
- Roger of Hoveden
- Ralph of Diceto
- Duvernoy, Jean, ed. (1976), Guillaume de Puylaurens, Chronique 1145–1275: Chronica magistri Guillelmi de Podio Laurentii, Paris: CNRS, ISBN 2-910352-06-4

Joan of England House of Plantagenet Born: October 1165 Died: 4 September 1199
Royal titles
Preceded by Margaret of Navarre	Queen consort of Sicily; 13 February 1177 – 11 November 1189	Succeeded by Sibylla of Acerra
