= Montescaglioso =

- Comune
- Comune di Montescaglioso
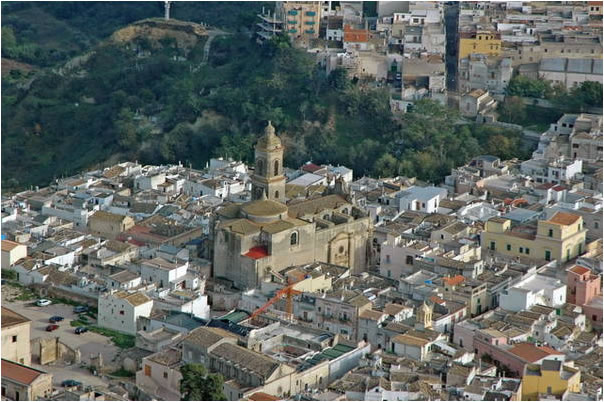
- View of Montescaglioso

- Coat of arms

- Location of Montescaglioso in Italy Montescaglioso (Basilicata)
- Coordinates: 40°33′N 16°40′E
- Country: Italy
- Region: Basilicata
- Province: Matera (MT)

Government
  - Mayor: Vincenzo Zito

Area
  - Total: 175.80 km^{2} (67.88 sq mi)
- Elevation: 352 m (1,155 ft)

Population (January 31, 2025)
  - Total: 9,193
  - Density: 52.29/km^{2} (135.4/sq mi)
- Demonym: Montese
- Time zone: UTC+1 (CET)
  - Summer (DST): UTC+2 (CEST)
- Postal code: 75024
- Dialing code: 0835
- ISTAT code: 077017
- Patron saint: Saint Roch
- Saint day: August 20
- Website: Official website

Montescaglioso (Montese: Mònde) is a town and comune in the Province of Matera, Basilicata, southern Italy.

The economy is mostly based on agriculture, including production of renowned oil and wine, as well as traditional food.

Historically, it was the centre of a county in the Norman Kingdom of Sicily.

== History ==
The first settlements in the area date from the 7th century BC, belonging to the Apuli Italic tribe. The original nucleus of Montescaglioso grew substantially in the following centuries, thanks to trade with the nearby Greek town of Metaponto. When the latter decayed in Roman times, Montescaglioso further increased in importance. Archaeological findings include a large tuff wall dating from the 3rd century BC.

After the decline of the Western Roman Empire, Montescaglioso is mentioned first only in early medieval times. A Byzantine stronghold, it was captured by the Normans after the year 1000, and housed an important Benedictine community. Under the Angevin and Aragonese dynasties of the Kingdom of Naples, it belonged in sequence to the D'Avalos, Orsini, Loffredo, Grillo and Cattaneo feudal families.

== Territorial abbacy of San Michele Arcangelo di Montescaglioso ==
The Benedictine Territorial Abbey (i.e. exerting diocesan authority over itself and the surrounding territory, instead of resorting under a bishop) of San Michele Arcangelo, exists at least from 1078 and was probably built in the 5th century. The Norman lord Humphrey of Hauteville and his son Rudolph made large donations to the abbey, which flourished until the 15th century. Afterwards it decayed due to numerous wars ravaging the country in those years. The benedictine Abbey Church (12th century), dedicated to St. Michael, has a notable portal and a Norman-style bell tower with mullioned windows. Renewed starting from 1590, it received a cylindrical cupola in 1650.

It lost its autonomous prelature status on 5 August 1910, when it was united (as a mere title) with the Metropolitan Archdiocese of Acerenza–Matera, but since its split the abbacy is united with the Metropolitan Archdiocese of Matera.

== Other sights ==
- Mother Church (1776), rebuilt in late Baroque style over a pre-existing medieval structure. In the aisles are four canvasses by Mattia Preti. There is also a 15th-century panel of the Madonna with Child.
- Church of St. Stephen (11th century)
- Church of St. Lucy (11th century)
- Church of Madonna della Muova (11th century) and Madonna delle Grazie (1065).
- 16th century churches of St. Roch, St. Augustin, Santa Maria del Vetrano.

== See also ==
- Humphrey of Hauteville
- Robert, Count of Montescaglioso
- Rudolf, Count of Montescaglioso
- Henry, Count of Montescaglioso
