= Richard II of Aquila =

12th-century Italo-Norman count

Richard II of Aquila was an Italo-Norman nobleman and count of Fondi. He was descended from a prominent Norman family from L'Aigle (Italianised as Aquila, both meaning "eagle"). He was one of the premier rebels against William I of Sicily during the first years of his reign. In May 1156, Richard betrayed the rebels of Bari and opened that city to the ravages of a vengeful William.

== Sources ==
- Hugo Falcandus. History of the Tyrants of Sicily at The Latin Library. (in Latin)
- Norwich, John Julius. The Kingdom in the Sun 1130-1194. London: Longman, 1970.
