= Walter Ophamil =

Archbishop of Palermo from 1168 to 1191

Walter Ophamil or Offamil (fl. 1160–1191), italianised as Gualtiero Offamiglio or Offamilio from Latin Ophamilius, was the archdeacon of Cefalù, dean of Agrigento, and archbishop of Palermo (1168–1191), called "il primo ministro", the first minister of the crown. He came to Sicily with Peter of Blois and Stephen du Perche at the direction of Rotrou, Archbishop of Rouen, cousin of Queen Margaret of Navarre, originally as a tutor to the royal children of William I of Sicily and Margaret. His mother was Bona, a patron of the Abbey of Cluny and a devota et fidelis nostra of the king in 1172. His father is unknown. From his name he was long thought to be an Englishman ("Walter of the Mill") but this interpretation is now rejected in favour of ophamilius referring to Walter as William II's protofamiliaris, the senior confidant of the king in his royal household, the familiaris regis.

== Biography ==
Walter's first appearance in the historical record is at court as the Latin tutor of the children of William I in 1160. He rose through the ranks until he was a canon of the Cappella Palatina and a candidate for the vacant archiepiscopal throne of 1168, after the deposition of Stephen du Perche. According to Hugo Falcandus, Walter succeeded "less by election than by violent intrusion." Nevertheless, without the support of the queen regent or of the influential Thomas Becket, his faction bribed Pope Alexander III into confirming his election and he was consecrated in the Cathedral of Palermo on 28 September. He received distinctly double-edged congratulations from Peter of Blois, who refers in a letter to his "humble birth".

Walter was a constant companion of the court of William II, whose tutor he had been. He accompanied William to Taranto to await his Byzantine bride and, failing that, he crowned Joanna, daughter of Henry II of England, as queen consort on 13 February 1177.

In 1174, the first fruits of a plan of the king and the vice-chancellor, Matthew of Ajello, began to flower. The pope issued the first of a short series of bulls favouring the cause of creating a new archdiocese in Sicily, centred on the Benedictine Cluniac abbey of Monreale, a recent foundation of William's. The abbot of said abbey would automatically be consecrated archbishop by any prelate of the realm approved of the king. The tradition of the Hagia Kyriaka, the chapel of the old Greek Orthodox metropolitans of Sicily, on the grounds of Monreale greatly strengthened the king's cause in an era when tradition was so valued. The archbishop of Palermo was greatly diminished in power by the consecration of the first archbishop of Monreale, in the spring of 1176. Walter began the construction of a new cathedral in Palermo at this time, to counter the effects of the beautiful Monreale, the new mausoleum of the Hauteville dynasty. On William's death in 1189, Walter fought vainly against the archbishop of Monreale over the body of the king.

In 1184, Walter gave his support to the marriage of Constance, daughter of Roger II, with Henry, son of Frederick Barbarossa. He was one of the only ones, for Constance, as the only legitimate heir to the throne, was long confined to a monastery due to a prophecy that "her marriage would destroy Sicily". Although he supported Constance to succeed William II, at the request of Pope Clement III, he had to crown Tancred of Lecce king in his cathedral in early January 1190. He died of natural causes early in 1191 and was buried in his rebuilt cathedral. Besides the cathedral, reworked so many times over the centuries, Walter left as architectural nods to his patronage of the arts the chapels of Santa Cristina and Santo Spirito. The latter is the "church of the Vespers," the church in front of which the first insult and the first murder of the Sicilian Vespers took place in 1282.

Richard of S. Germano called him and Matthew "the two firmest columns of the Kingdom." Modern historiography has been less kind. John Julius Norwich calls him "the most baleful influence on the kingdom," because "there is no evidence of his having taken a single constructive step to improve the Sicilian position or to advance Sicilian fortunes." He has been reckoned a leader of the feudatories against which all Sicilian kings fought for their royal prerogatives and, by Ferdinand Chalandon, as an imperialist who supported Henry in order to stand opposed to the inevitable civil war.

In literature, Walter, on the basis of his supposed English birth, was credited as the author of a Latin rudiments by John Bale in the 1550s. Léopold Hervieux identified Walter with the Anglo-Norman author Gualterus Anglicus. He went so far as to suggest that Gualterus' (Walter's) Latin versifications of Aesop's fables were intended to instruct and entertain the young William II.

== Sources ==
- Loewenthal, L. J. A. (1972). "For the biography of Walter Ophamil, archbishop of Palermo". The English Historical Review 87:75–82.
- Matthew, Donald J. A. (2004). "Walter (d. 1190)". Oxford Dictionary of National Biography. Oxford: Oxford University Press. Accessed 8 July 2008.
- Norwich, J. J. (1970). The Kingdom in the Sun, 1130–1194. London: Longmans.
