= Romuald Guarna =

Archbishop of Salerno from 1153 to 1181/2

Romuald Guarna (between 1110 and 1120 – 1 April 1181/2) was the Archbishop of Salerno (as Romuald II) from 1153 to his death. He is remembered primarily for his Chronicon sive Annales, an important historical record of his time.

== Life ==
Romuald was a native of Salerno, born into the old Lombard nobility. He studied as a youth in the Schola Medica Salernitana, where he studied not only medicine (in which he taught Gilles de Corbeil), but history, law, and theology. Romuald was raised to the Salernitan archbishopric after the death of William of Ravenna.

Romuald was a diplomat for the kings William I and William II. He negotiated the Treaty of Benevento of 1156 and signed the Treaty of Venice in 1177. Though he took part in the conspiracy against the Admiral Maio of Bari, he never fell out of favour and even performed the coronation of William II. Despite this, he exaggerates his own importance in his chronicle, which characteristically begins at creation and extends till 1178.

In 1160-1161, Romuald defended the city from the enraged William I, who was avenging the assassination of Maio. With the help of Salernitans at court and their connections to the king's intimates, the city was spared. In 1167, as the highest-ranking prelate in the realm, he crowned William II as king in the Cathedral of Palermo.

In 1179, Romuald intervened in a council condemning the Albigensians. He was succeeded by Nicholas of Ajello.

== Chronicon sive Annales ==
Romuald's work at a chronicle known as Chronicon was obviously connected with his studies at the Schola Salernitanae where his family had been involved over generations. It was part of a universal history and editions of the 19th century usually started with one paragraph before the last part called "Historia Normannorum, pars Sicula" (about the Norman kingdom of Sicily). According to Massimo Oldoni the preceding compilation already existed, when Romuald was a child, the earlier Norman history also does not use the third person like the portion ascribed to him.

=== Editions ===
- Giuseppe Del Re (notes & translation into Italian), ed. (1845). "Cronica di Romualdo Guarna archivescovo Salernitano (Chronicon Romualdi II archiepiscopi Salernitani)". Cronisti e scrittori sincroni della dominazione normanna nel regno di Puglia e Sicilia. Vol. 1. Naples: Stamperia dell'Iride. pp. 3–80.
- Guarna, Romuald (1866). Arndt, Wilhelm (ed.). Romoaldi II archiepiscopi Salernitani Annales. MGH Scriptorum (in Latin). Vol. XIX (dMGH ed.). Hannover: Hahnsche Buchhandlung. pp. 387–461.
- Guarna, Romualdo (2001). Chronicon. Schola Salernitana - Studi e testi. Vol. 6. Cinzia Bonetti (ed. & translation into Italian). Cava de' Tirreni: Avagliano. ISBN 978-88-8309-056-1.
- Romualdus Salernitanus (2020). Monella, Paolo (ed.). Chronicon. Palermo: Archivio della Latinità Italiana del Medioevo (ALIM).
- A partial English translation of his chronicle is given as an appendix in Graham A. Loud and Thomas Weidermann's translation of Hugo Falcundus' The History of the Tyrants of Sicily. eISBN 9781526112620
