= Matthew of Ajello =

Norman courtier in Sicily

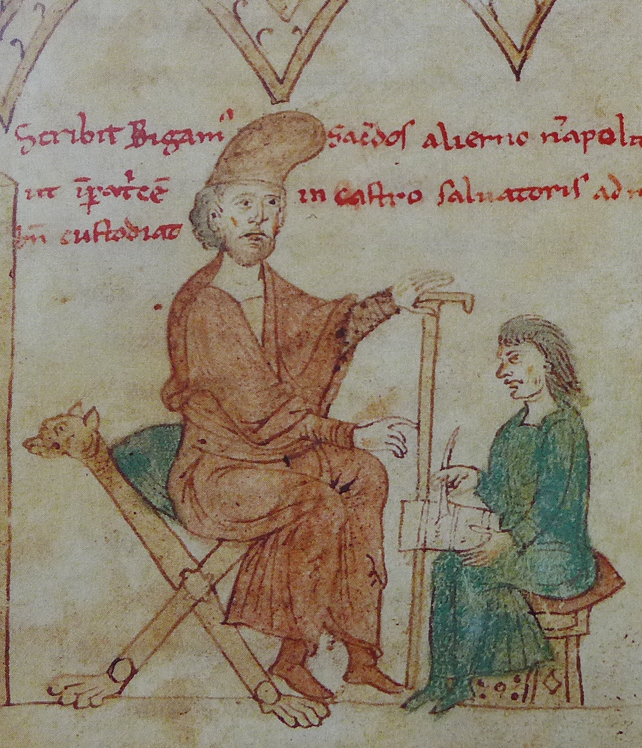
Matthew in Peter of Eboli's Liber ad honorem Augusti, c. 1197

Matthew of Ajello (Italian: Matteo d'Aiello) was a high-ranking member of the Norman court of the Kingdom of Sicily in the 12th century. His brother John was a bishop.

== Career ==
He first appears as the notary of the Admiral Maio of Bari who drew up the Treaty of Benevento of 1156. He rose to prominence in the next reign, that of William II of Sicily, becoming first grand protonotary and then chancellor.

Maio groomed Matthew to be his successor and, it was alleged, even used him to get permission from Pope Alexander III in Rome for Maio to succeed William I in 1159. On 10 November 1160, Matthew warned Maio of an impending assassination attempt, but to no avail. While Matthew escaped, Maio was killed by Matthew Bonnellus.

In 1162, Matthew interceded to prevent the William I from sacking Salerno. On William's death, he became foremost among the advisors of the queen regent, Margaret of Navarre. After the rebellions of the later years of William's reign, Matthew compiled from memory a vast catalogue of records lost in the revolts. In 1166, he was a candidate for the chancellorship but was passed over in favour of Stephen du Perche, which caused him lasting resentment.

He took part in the conspiracies of Henry, Count of Montescaglioso, but was not arrested. However, he joined with Gentile, Bishop of Agrigento to assassinate Stephen in Palermo after Henry's arrest in Messina. This failed and both were arrested. Yet from prison Matthew coordinated a new conspiracy, and his plotters successfully besieged the chancellor in the cathedral tower and released Matthew, who offered the chancellor the opportunity to leave unmolested on crusade, paving the way for Matthew's own rise to the chancellery.

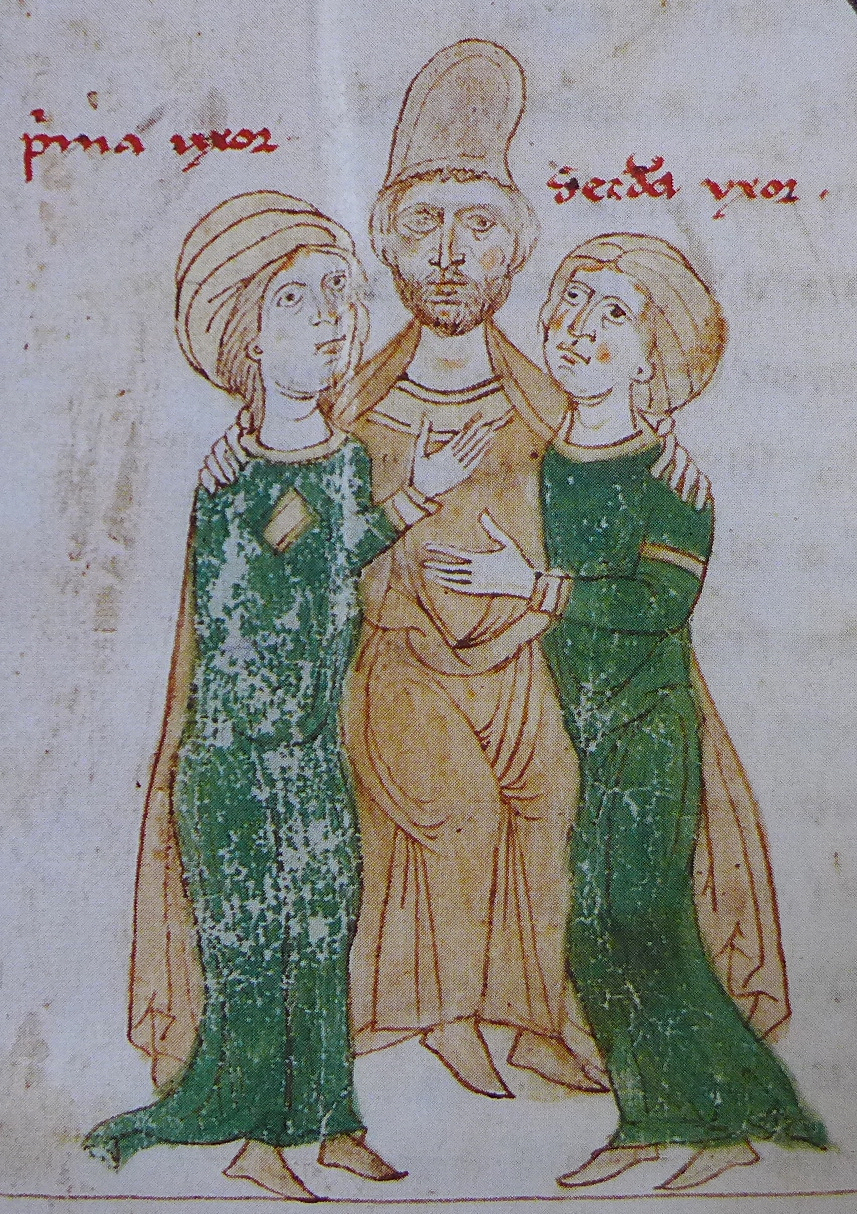
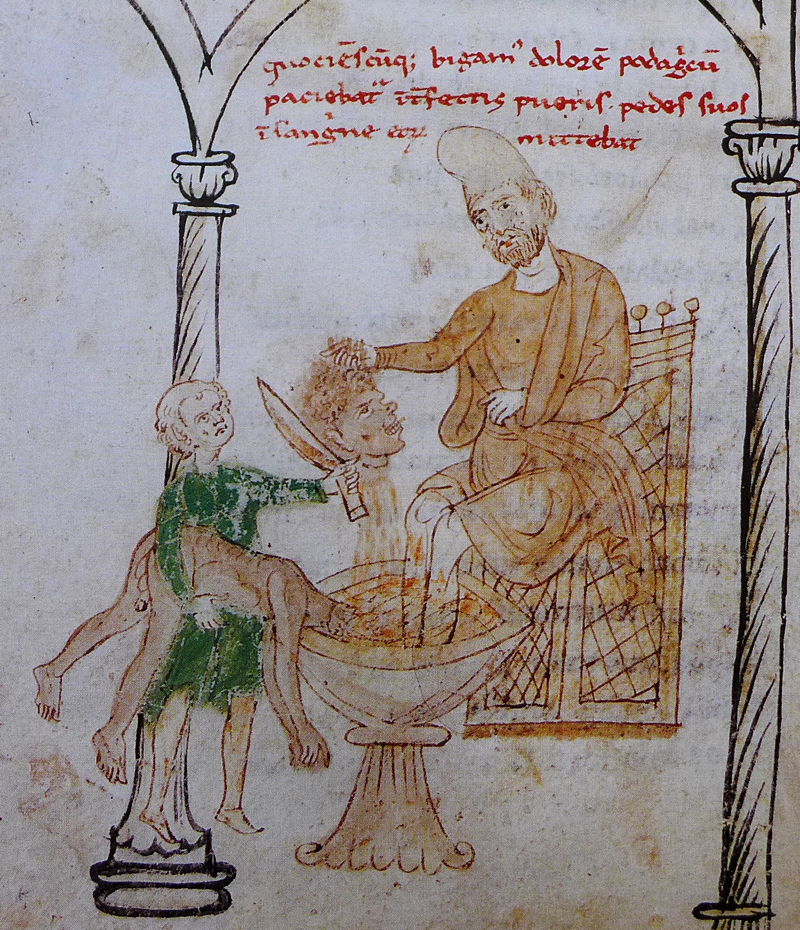
Matthew is depicted above with two wives and then bathing his feet in the blood of children in Peter of Eboli's Liber ad honorem Augusti

Matthew was not raised immediately to the rank of chancellor. He was first appointed vice-chancellor (1169), in which capacity he constantly advised Margaret against interfering in the crisis between church and state in England, where Margaret supported Thomas Becket and Pope Alexander III, and Matthew firmly supported King Henry II, believing his cause was similar to that of the previous monarchs of Sicily. For similar reasons, in his later years he opposed Walter of the Mill's feudalising and pro-imperial policies. The chronicler Richard of San Germano described Walter and Matthew as "the two firmest columns of the Kingdom."

Matthew was known to be a cruel bigamist. Though racked with gout, which the poet Peter of Eboli states he tried to cure by washing his feet in the blood of children.

Matthew opposed the marriage of Princess Constance paternal aunt of William II to Prince Henry of Holy Roman Empire, the future Henry VI; while William II had named his aunt heiress to the Sicilian throne and ordered Matthew and others to swear fealty, Matthew induced Walter and other barons to support Tancred, Count of Lecce, an illegitimate cousin of William, for the throne after the death of William. It was Matthew's propaganda against Roger of Andria that ruined that claimant's candidature and secured Tancred's coronation and Matthew's urging that brought the Pope Clement III on side. For this, Tancred created Matthew chancellor, the first since the flight of Stephen du Perche in 1168.

In 1191 Emperor Henry attempted to invade Sicily to strive for the Sicilian crown for Empress Constance but failed and retreated, leaving Constance at Salerno as a sign that he would soon return. Nicholas son of Matthew who had been made archbishop of Salerno was hostile to Germans, and at then he was at Naples to help the defense there. He wrote letters to some friends at Salerno, and later they resubmitted to Tancred and handed Constance over to him. Unable to persuade Tancred to put Constance to death, Queen Sibylla discussed with Matthew on the place to imprison Constance, and Matthew wrote a letter to Tancred at her presence, managing to persuade him to lock Constance in Castel dell'Ovo at Naples, a castle on an island and surrounded by water to be better-guarded and secluded from people, in the custody of nobleman Aligerno Cottone who was defending Naples. In addition Matthew wrote to Aligerno ordering him to "ut imperatricem in Castro Salvatoris ad mare benè custodiat" (guard the empress in Castle of the Savior (i. e. Castel dell'Ovo) in the sea properly). However, only one year later under the pressure of Pope Celestine III Tancred had to send Constance to Rome to exchange for his recognition from the Pope, and on the way Constance was released by German soldiers.

Matthew's health, however, continued to deteriorate and he died at a great old age in 1193. He left as his monument a nunnery in Palermo named San Benedetto. He had two sons of influence: Richard, who was made count of Ajello (Calabria), and the aforementioned Nicholas.

== Assessment ==
- While not predicting Matthew to be prominent, Falcandus never denied his ability or intelligence, and twice claimed at court that he was the wisest man. It is inferred that Matthew was specialized in Arabic, Greek and Latin.
- Monk Peter of Eboli who served for Henry VI and Constance never referred Matthew as Chancellor and referred him as "bigamus, sacerdos, scariothis, Hydra" (bigamist, priest, Iscariot, Hydra).
