= Maio of Bari =

12th-century admiral of Sicily

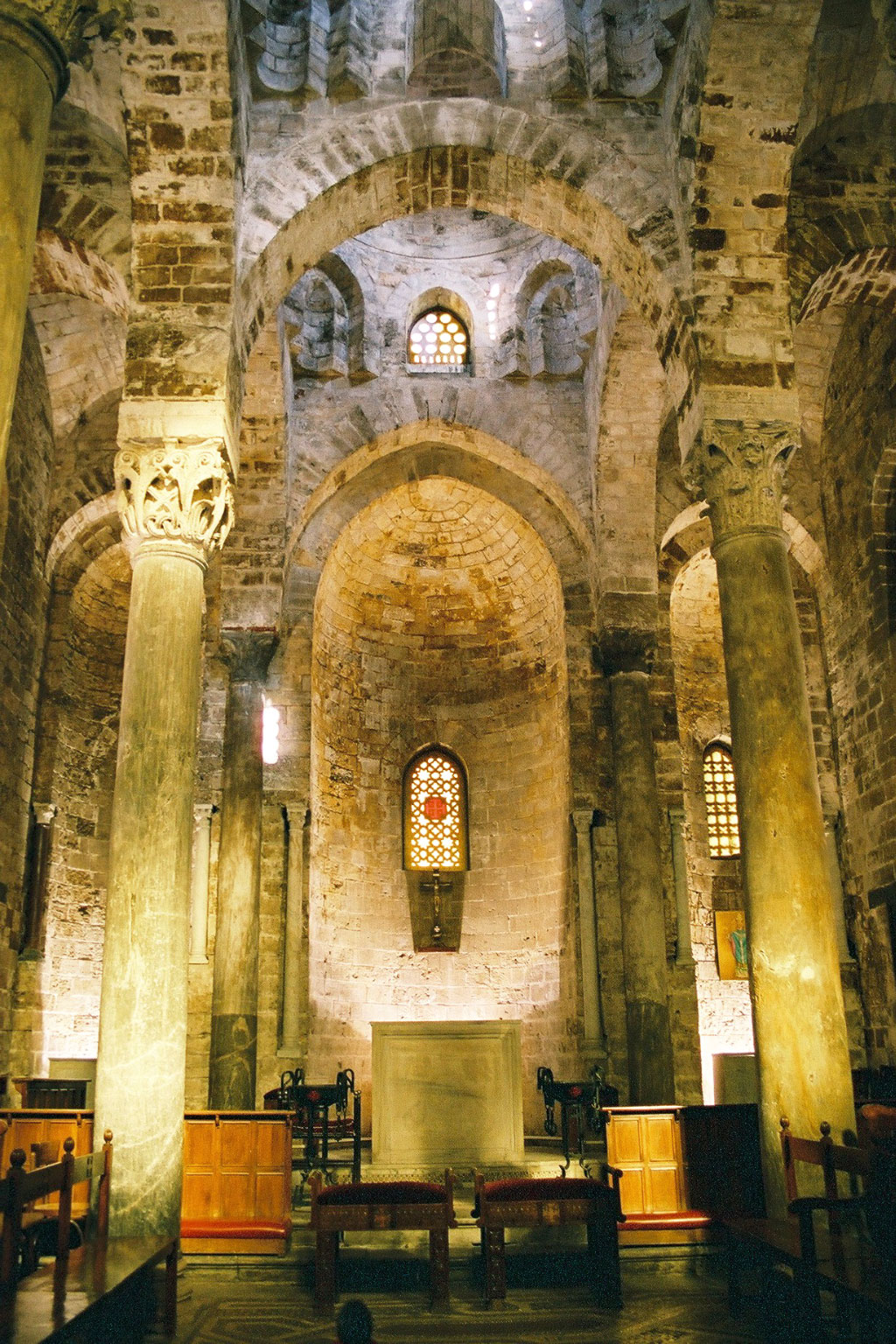
Maio endowed the church of San Cataldo, Palermo, one of the last Arabesque Latin churches in Norman Sicily. Its interior is now stripped of its adornments.

Maio of Bari (Italian: Maione da Bari) (died 10 November 1160) was the third of the great admirals of Sicily and the most important man in the Norman kingdom of Sicily during the reign of William I (1154–66). Lord Norwich calls him "one of the most influential statesmen in Europe."

== Rise to the rank of admiral ==
Maio was born in the first decades of the twelfth century to Leo of Rayza and Kuraza, members of the urban upper class in Bari. Leo is documented as a judge in Bari between 1119 and 1135, as a royal justice from 1141 and as a regalis supra iudex ("royal superior judge") or protoiudex ("first judge") from 1142 to 1147. He was dead by 1155. The death of Maio's mother, Kuraza, is recorded in the necrology of the cathedral of Salerno as falling on 26 July 1158. The contemporary Liber de regno sicilie, a partisan source, falsely claims that Maio was the son of an oil merchant. In his Chronicle and Annals, Romuald Guarna (died 1181/2), a partisan of the other side, calls Maio "certainly an eloquent, fully honest and discreet man" (vir utique facundus, satis providus et discretus).

Maio is first documented as the royal scriniarius, the official in charge of the archive of the royal court (curia regia), in a royal concession to the monastery of Santa Maria Maddalena di Valle Giosafat in October 1144. Down to February 1148, he continued to witness documents, always as scriniarius, whenever the chancellor, Robert of Selby, was absent. The written record attests that he was constantly present with the court at either Messina or Palermo during this period. In 1149, he was granted the title "vice-chancellor" (vicecancellarius), which appears to have been created specifically for him. His new rank probably reflected a change in status, from that of a functionary internal to the chancery to a more clearly defined role in the government. After the death of Robert of Selby, he was promoted to head the chancery. He first appears with the title of "chancellor" (cancellarius) in May 1152, in an Arabic-language document of the duana regia (or dīwān al-ma’mūr), the office which controlled the royal fisc, concerning a dispute between the monastery of San Giorgio di Triocala and the lord of Calamonaci.

After the deposition and execution of the admiral Philip of Mahdia (1153), the admiralcy was vacant for a year. Shortly after his coronation (4 April 1154), King William I appointed Maio to the rank of "admiral of admirals" (amiratus amiratorum). In June 1154, he subscribed to an official copy of a donation of land and serfs to the monastery of San Nicolò del Churchuro from 1149. Between October 1154 and May 1160 Maio's standard title was magnus [great] ammiratus ammiratorum. Although this title, derived from the Arabic amir al-umarā' (literally "emir of emirs"), evolved into a purely military one (cf. admiral), in Maio's time it was an administrative title. The Arabic writer Ibn al-Athīr, who called Maio a "sad governor" for his role in the rebellion against William I, translated his title as vizier.

== Heading the government ==
Maio was not popular with the baronage and supported the immigration of Western Europeans, Roman Catholics all, to increase the influence of that church, which was his largest supporter (at first). The chiefest of baronial opponents to Maio was, at first, Robert de Bassonville, the count of Loritello and cousin to the king. He resented Maio's rise and his own cousin's royal powers. He joined with a Byzantine army under Michael Palaeologus in 1155 and took Bari. At that time, the king fell ill and remained so from September to Christmas. Maio and Hugh, Archbishop of Palermo took control of the kingdom in the meantime. It was then, with revolt spreading in the peninsula, that insurrection began in the island. A conspiracy formed to overthrow both Maio and the king. Maio refused to panic, and the major revolts were soon dead. However, a revolt led by one Bartholomew of Garsiliato took Butera, Sicily, and proceeded to declare themselves in armed insurrection. The rebels demanded that the king remove Maio and the archbishop from his inner circle. William refused. The rebels stirred up riots in the capital of Palermo itself, where the people demanded the release of Count Simon of Policastro, whom Maio had imprisoned without trial. William negotiated himself out of the bind, and Maio remained his right-hand man, though Maio's own right-hand, Asclettin, the chancellor, was imprisoned by the king.

In 1156, it was Maio who was primarily responsible for the Treaty of Benevento, which ended hostilities between Sicily and the Holy See and preserved for William the legatine powers granted originally to his father. The newfound alliance with Adrian IV made the Sicilians enemies, inevitably, of the Holy Roman Emperor Frederick Barbarossa. Maio may have even been present at the formation of the Lombard League, as an envoy of William's. Maio's concentration on events to the north, however, proved the downfall of the African possessions of the crown. On 11 January 1160, Mahdia surrendered, and Maio received a lot of the blame. His unpopularity peaked, but so did his power.

His enemies spread rumours that he was aiming to seize the crown, that he had already seized the regalia with the help of Queen Margaret, with whom he was certainly in bed, and that he was even planning the king's assassination: with the help of the pope. Certainly, all such allegations were patent nonsense, but a conspiracy arose on the peninsula around one Matthew Bonnellus, who planned to assassinate the admiral himself. Bonnellus was an intimate of Maio, who wished to marry his daughter to him, and therefore was well-positioned to strike the undoing blow. While Maio prepared a wedding, Bonnellus prepared an assassination. On 10 November 1160, in the street called Via Coperta, Bonnellus and his conspirators stabbed Maio to death and severely wounded his chief protégé, Matthew of Ajello. Maio's wife and children were quickly whisked away as a mob descended on his palace. It was a brutal end.

Maio's influence as a courtier of William was great. His administration is noted primarily for consolidating the centralisation begun under the first two Rogers. Though he neglected the widespread conquests (wrought largely by George of Antioch) of the kingdom, he assured a stability that proved after his death to be very volatile. The King's confidence in him was so great as to result in the nomination of his brother Stephen and his brother-in-law Simon to high posts of captain in Apulia and seneschal. According to his enemy the chronicler "Hugo Falcandus" put it:

This Maio was a very monster; indeed, it would be impossible to find vermin more loathsome, more pernicious or more damaging to the Kingdom. His character was capable of any baseness, and his eloquence was equal to his character. Great was his facility for pretence or dissimulation at will. He was, in addition, much given to debauchery, for ever seeking to bring noble matrons and virgins to his bed; the more unstained their virtue, the more ardently did he strive to possess them.

Maio wrote an "Exposition of the Lord's Prayer" in the scholastic tradition.

== Sources ==
- Johns, Jeremy; Metcalfe, Alex (1999). "The Mystery at Chùrchuro: Conspiracy or Incompetence in Twelfth-Century Sicily?". Bulletin of the School of Oriental and African Studies, University of London. 62 (2). Cambridge University Press: 226–259. doi:10.1017/S0041977X00016694.
- Metcalfe, Alex (2009). Muslims of Medieval Italy. University of Edinburgh Press.
- Alio, Jacqueline. Margaret, Queen of Sicily. New York: Trinacria, 2017.
- Norwich, J. J. The Kingdom in the Sun, 1130–1194. London: Longman, 1970.
