= William II of Sicily =

King of Sicily from 1166 to 1189

William II
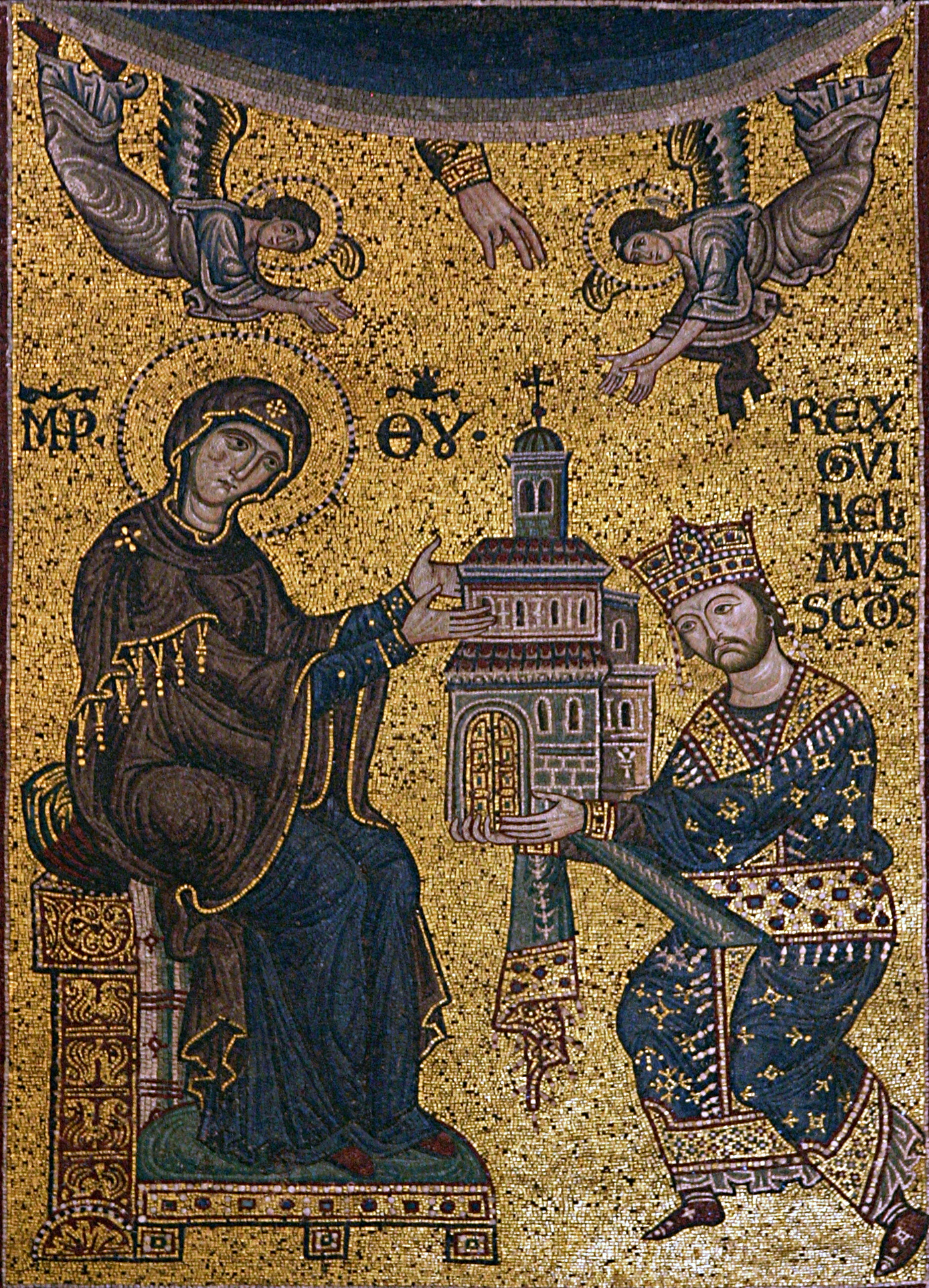
- William II offering the Monreale Cathedral to the Virgin Mary.

King of Sicily
- Reign: 7 May 1166 – 11 November 1189
- Predecessor: William I
- Successor: Tancred
- Born: December 1153; Palermo, Kingdom of Sicily
- Died: 11 November 1189 (aged 35); Palermo, Kingdom of Sicily
- Burial: Cathedral of Palermo, Sicily
- Spouse: Joan of England
- House: Hauteville
- Father: William I of Sicily
- Mother: Margaret of Navarre

William II (December 1153 – 11 November 1189), called the Good, was king of Sicily from 1166 to 1189. From surviving sources William's character is indistinct. Lacking in military enterprise, secluded and pleasure-loving, he seldom emerged from his palace life at Palermo. Yet his reign is marked by an ambitious foreign policy and a vigorous diplomacy. Champion of the papacy and in secret league with the Lombard cities, he was able to defy the common enemy, Frederick Barbarossa. Recent scholarship has also stressed that the relative stability of William's reign on the mainland rested less on the disappearance of aristocratic power than on a continuing political settlement in which counts, lesser barons, and royal military officers remained central to the governance of Apulia and the Terra di Lavoro. In the Divine Comedy, Dante places William II in Paradise. He is also referred to in Boccaccio's Decameron (tale IV.4, where he reportedly has two children, and tale V.7).

William was nicknamed "the Good" only in the decades following his death. It is due less to his character than to the cessation of the internal troubles that plagued his father's reign and the wars that erupted under his successor. Under the Staufer dynasty his reign was characterised as a golden age of peace and justice. His numeral is contemporary and he himself used it. (Note: On some coins he used the Kufic inscription al-malik Ghulam al-thani, meaning "King William the Second")

== Kingship ==
=== Regency of his mother ===
William was born in Palermo to William I and Margaret of Navarre. At the age of twelve his father died, and he was placed under the regency of his mother. In 1171 he was declared adult and until then the government was controlled first by the chancellor Stephen du Perche (1166–1168), cousin of Margaret, and then by Walter Ophamil, archbishop of Palermo, and Matthew of Ajello, the vice-chancellor. The regency inherited a kingdom whose mainland administration still depended on overlapping aristocratic, judicial, and military structures rather than a fully uniform central apparatus.

In 1168, du Perche was overthrown by a coup, while the revolts claimed that William was murdered and du Perche planned to have his brother marry Constance, aunt of William who was confined to Santissimo Salvatore, Palermo as a nun from childhood due to a prediction that "her marriage would destroy Sicily", to claim the throne, despite the existence of Henry, Prince of Capua brother of William.

=== Marriage and alliances ===
An effort by Bertrand II, archbishop of Trani, to negotiate the hand of Byzantine Princess Maria for William yielded no fruit and led to his breaking up with Byzantine Emperor Manuel I Comnenus in 1172. In 1173, the Emperor Frederick Barbarossa proposed William's marriage with his daughter, Beatrice, but William refused to offend the pope.

In the same year the death of Henry, Prince of Capua marked a potential succession crisis: it was said that William II had Constance, the last legitimate heir to the throne, appointed heir and sworn fealty in 1174, but she remained confined in her monastery. By this stage, the succession question had implications not only for the royal household but also for the balance of power across the mainland provinces, where counties, lordships, and offices remained politically consequential prizes.

In 1174 and 1175 William made treaties with Genoa and Venice and his marriage in February 1177 with Joan, daughter of King Henry II of England and Duchess Eleanor of Aquitaine, marks his high position in European politics. Although Joan produced no surviving heir, William showed no intention to annul the marriage.

In July 1177, William sent a delegation of Archbishop Romuald II of Salerno and Count Roger of Andria to sign the Treaty of Venice with the Emperor. In 1184, he released 30-year-old Constance from convent, engaged her to the Emperor's son, the future Emperor Henry VI to secure the peace, and married her off on January 1186, causing a general oath to be taken to her as his heir presumptive. This step, of great consequence to the Norman realm, was possibly taken that William might devote himself to foreign conquests, or aiming to prevent Tancred, Count of Lecce, an illegitimate cousin of William, to claim the throne.

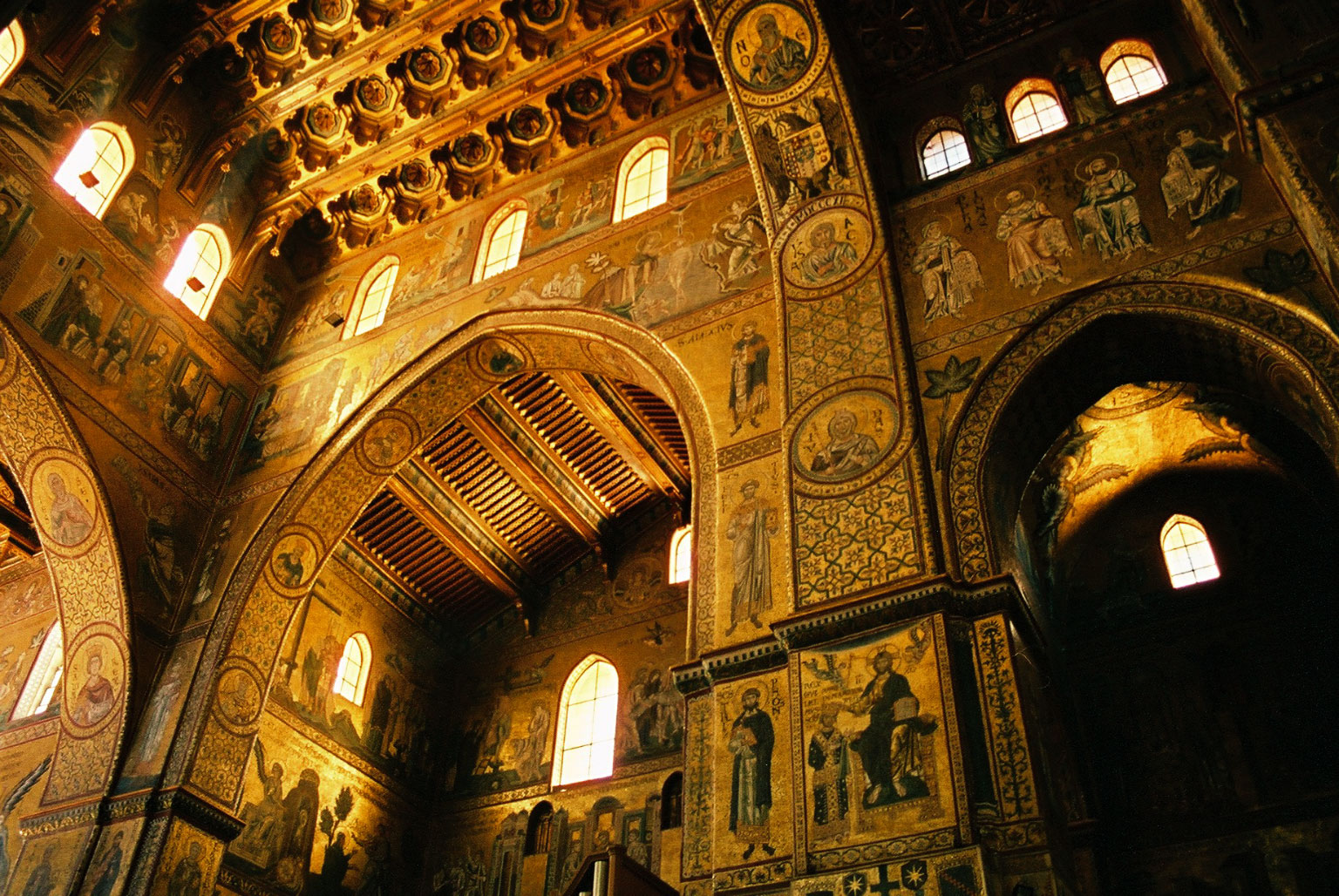
Monreale Cathedral, built during William's II reign. William and his parents are buried there.

=== Wars with Egypt and Byzantine Empire ===
Unable to revive the African dominion, William directed his attack on Ayyubid Egypt, from which Saladin threatened the Latin kingdom of Jerusalem. In July 1174, 30,000 men were landed before Alexandria, but Saladin's arrival forced the Sicilians to re-embark in disorder. A better prospect opened in the confusion in Byzantine affairs which followed the death of Manuel Comnenus (1180), and William took up the old design and feud against the Byzantine Empire. Dyrrhachium was captured (11 June 1185). Afterwards while the army (allegedly 80,000 men including 5,000 knights) marched upon Thessalonica, the fleet (200 ships) sailed towards the same target capturing on their way the Ionian islands of Corfu, Cephalonia, Ithaca and Zakynthos. In August 1185, Thessalonica fell to the joint attack of the Sicilian fleet and army and was subsequently sacked.

The troops then marched upon the capital, but the army of the emperor Isaac Angelus, under the general Alexios Branas, defeated the invaders on the banks of the Strymon (7 November 1185). Thessalonica was at once abandoned and in 1189 William made peace with Isaac, abandoning all the conquests. He was now planning to induce the crusading armies of the West to pass through his territories, and seemed about to play a leading part in the Third Crusade. His admiral Margarito, a naval genius equal to George of Antioch, with 60 vessels kept the eastern Mediterranean open for the Franks, and forced the strong Saladin to retire from before Tripoli in the spring of 1188.

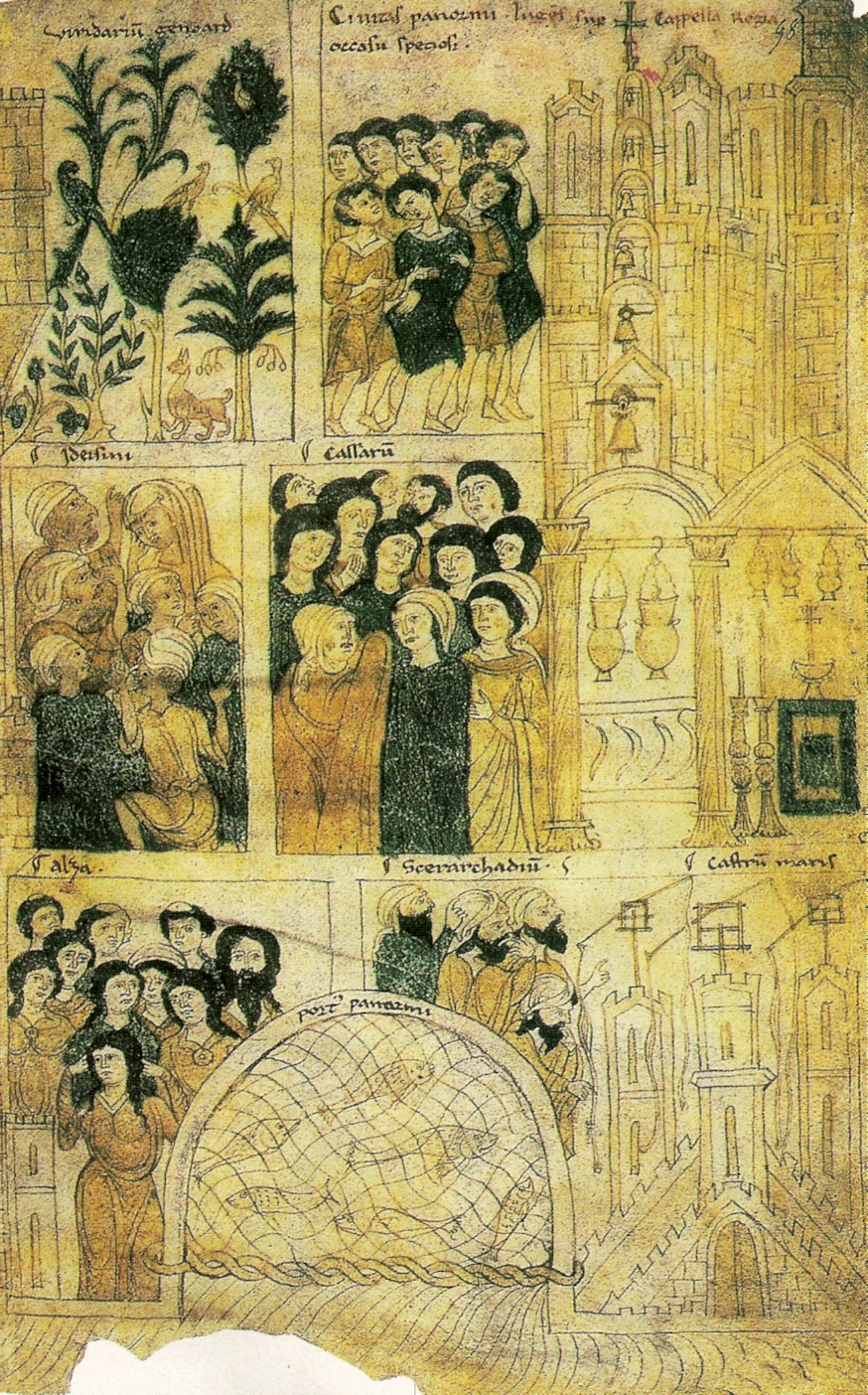
Palermo in mourning for the death of William II, from the Liber ad honorem Augusti by Peter of Eboli.

== Death ==
In November 1189 William died at Palermo, leaving no children, although Robert of Torigni records a short-lived son in 1181: Bohemond, who was named Duke of Apulia.

After his death Norman officials led by Matthew of Ajello supported his cousin Tancred to succeed him, instead of Constance, in order to avoid German rule. Tancred was not merely a court candidate: as count of Lecce, and as lord in the so-called principality of Taranto, he already possessed a substantial mainland power base in southern Apulia.

== Sources ==
- Böhme, Eric (2024), 1190: A Letter from al-Mahdiyya Reports on a Muslim Uprising on Sicily, in: Transmediterranean History 6.1, DOI: https://doi.org/10.18148/tmh/2024.6.1.78.
- Fernández-Aceves, Hervin (2020). County and Nobility in Norman Italy: Aristocratic Agency in the Kingdom of Sicily, 1130–1189. London and New York: Bloomsbury Academic. ISBN 978-1-3501-3322-8.
- Fernández-Aceves, Hervin (2019). "Royal comestabuli and Military Control in the Sicilian Kingdom: A Prosopographical Contribution to the Study of Italo-Norman Aristocracy". Medieval Prosopography. 34: 1–34.
- Frohlich, Walter (1993). Chibnall, Marjorie (ed.). "The Marriage of Henry VI and Constance of Sicily: Prelude and Consequences". Anglo-Norman Studies: XV. Proceedings of the Battle Conference. The Boydell Press.
- Hermans, Jos (1980). "The Byzantine View of the Normans- Another Norman Myth?". Proceedings of the Battle Conference on Anglo-Norman Studies. II. The Boydell Press: 78–92.
- Queller, D. E.; Madden, Thomas F. (1997). The Fourth Crusade The Conquest of Constantinople. University of Pennsylvania Press.
- Runciman, Steven (2012). The Sicilian Vespers: A History of the Mediterranean World in the Later Thirteenth Century. Cambridge University Press.
- Travaini, Lucia (1991). "Aspects of the Sicilian Norman Copper Coinage in the Twelfth Century". The Numismatic Chronicle. 151.
- Matthew, Donald. The Norman Kingdom of Sicily. Cambridge University Press: 1992.

Preceded by William I	King of Sicily; 1166–1189	Succeeded by Tancred
Preceded by Simon	Prince of Taranto; 1157–1189	Succeeded by Tancred
