= Hugo Falcandus =

Historian

Hugo Falcandus was a historian who chronicled the reigns of William I of Sicily and the minority of his son William II in a highly critical work entitled The History of the Tyrants of Sicily (or Liber de Regno Sicilie). The Latin of the work is polished. The name Hugo Falcandus first appears in a Paris printed edition of 1550, and no surviving medieval manuscript attributes the Liber de Regno Sicilie to that name. There is some doubt as to whether "Hugo Falcandus" is a real name or a pseudonym. Evelyn Jamison argued that he was Eugenius, amiratus from 1190. The Frenchman Hugues Foucaud (Hugo Fulcaudus), abbot of Saint-Denis, has been proposed as an author. His name, Falcandus, is apparently a cacography for Falcaudus, Latin for "Foucaud", a French surname. According to Graham Loud, "Hugo Falcandus", was a native of the Kingdom of Sicily rather than someone from northern Europe.

The History covers the period from the death of Roger II in 1154 to the majority of William II, in 1169. Hugo concentrates on the internal politics of the Palermitan Norman court. Intrigues and scandals are never ignored. He has a low opinion of most of his contemporaries and ascribes villainous intent to next to all actions. Nevertheless, his detailed account is so far above other narratives of like time and place that he cannot on grounds of bias be overlooked. Modern scholarship continues to treat the Liber as an indispensable, if strongly partisan, source for reconstructing court politics, aristocratic competition, and factional alignments in the kingdom, and it has also been used in relational approaches to examine patterns of communication and influence within the Palermitan court. According to Lord Norwich, he "has been compared to Tacitus and Thucydides."

The first English translation, by G. A. Loud and T. Wiedemann, was published in 1998.

== Sources ==
- Alio, Jacqueline. Margaret, Queen of Sicily. Trinacria: New York, 2017.
- Fernández-Aceves, Hervin. County and Nobility in Norman Italy: Aristocratic Agency in the Kingdom of Sicily, 1130–1189. Bloomsbury Academic: London and New York, 2020.
- Fernández-Aceves, Hervin. "Social network analysis and narrative structures: measuring communication and influence in a Medieval source for the Kingdom of Sicily." Intersticios Sociales 14 (2017): 125–153.
- Norwich, John Julius. The Kingdom in the Sun 1130-1194. Longman: London, 1970.
- History of the Tyrants of Sicily at The Latin Library
- G. B.: La 'Historia' o 'Liber de Regno Sicilie' e la Epistola ad Petrum Panormitane Ecclesie Thesaurarium di Ugo Falcando, bearb. v. , Siragusa, Roma 1897
