= Table of Noteworthy Cities (Ptolemy) =

Ancient text

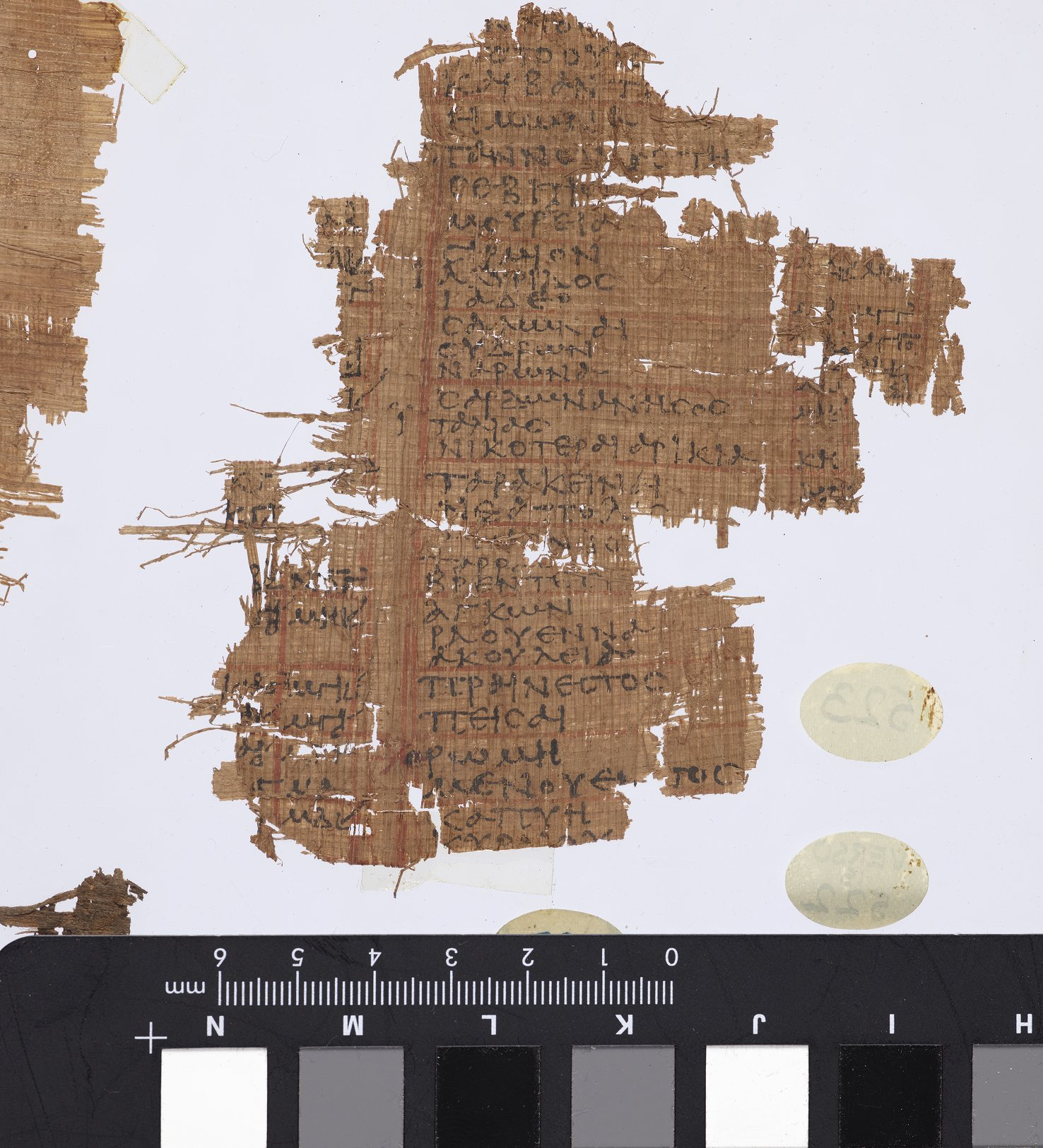
Early 3rd Century AD papyrus fragment of the Kanon in the John Rylands Research Institute and Library

The Table of Noteworthy Cities (Ancient Greek: κανὼν πόλεων ἐπισήμων, romanized: Kanòn Póleon Episémon; also known as "the Kanon") is a list of cities compiled by Ptolemy shortly after creating the Geography. Whilst the term "πόλεων ἐπισήμων/póleon episémon" (noteworthy cities) was in use before his time, Ptolemy is thought to have popularised the term. Roberts (1938) suggests that it formed an aid ("hilfsmittel") to the Handy Tables.

== Text ==
Originally, the text of the Kanon was thought, for example by Vogul Fischer, to derive from Book 8 of the Geography, however it is now demonstrated to be part of an independent textual tradition. The first critical edition and translation into a modern language (German) appeared in 2006 by Koch, Mittenhuber and Stückelberger.

Several medieval recensions of the text survive with the earliest being the early 3rd century P. Ryl. Gr. 3 522 in the Rylands Library of Manchester University; the next 4 oldest manuscripts date to the 9th century:

Manuscripts of the Kanon
Siglum	Library	Shelfmark	Folios	Date	Notes	Source
L	Leiden	BPG 78	66r-74v	partially c.813-20 AD		
V	Vatican	gr. 1291	17v–21v	c.820 AD	Ogival majuscule hand.	
M	Marcian	gr. 331	1r/v	9th cent.		
f	Laurentian	Plutei 28.26	51r–54v	end of 9th cent.		

=== Rylands Papyrus 522 ===
The Rylands Papyrus 522 is the earliest surviving fragment of the Kanon, that from tables 2 to 6 (Europe), dating from the early to mid 3rd century AD, less than a generation after Ptolemy himself. It measures 11.3cm by 11.7cm and was acquired by Rylands Library in 1917 and was authored, it is thought, in Fayum. According to Defaux, who produced the critical edition and translation in 2020, the following cities are mentioned in the fragment:

P. Ryl. Gr. 3 522 (from Europe, Tables 2 - 6)
City	Latitude	Longitude
Clunia	11°	42°
Caesaraugusta	14° 30’	41° 30’
Gallia Aquitania
Mediolanum	17° 40’	46° 45’
Burgigala	18°	45° 30’
Gallia Lugdunensis
Augustodunum	23° 20’	46° 10’
Lugdunum	23° 15’	45° 20’
Gallia Belgica
Gesoriacum	22° 30’	53° 20’
Durocottorum	23° 15’	48° 30’
Gallia Narbonensis
Massalia	21° 10’	43° 5’
Narbo	21° 30’	43° 15’
Arelate	21° 15’	43° 20’
Vienna	23°	44°
Nemausus	22°	44° 30’
Germania
Pannonia Superior
Poetovio		
Scarbantia		
Emona		
Pannonia Inferior		
Servitium		
Mursia		
Sirmium	4 4° 30’	45° [...]
Illyricym
Iader	42°	43° 20’
Salonae	4[3]° 30’	43° 40’
Sidrona	[4]3° 15’	44° 30’
Narona	44° 20’	[42°] 45’
Scardona Insula	41° 30’	[43° 30’]
Italia
Nicotera Aricia	28°	4[...]
Terracinae	37° 30’	
Neapolis		
Rhegium Iulium		
Tarentum		
Brundisium		
Ancona		
Ravenna		
Aquileia		
Praeneste		
Pisae		
Roma		
Beneventum		
Capua		
Corsica Insula		

=== Comparison of Codicies to Papyrus ===
Approximately 27 toponyms survive intact on the papyrus which can be compared with the 8th century codicies to study the transmission of the text. Of the three manuscripts V, L & f (M is difficult to read):

- V is the most innovative, only 8 toponyms are copied directly with the rest of the document populated with different places.
- 3 toponyms only appear in the papyus and do not appear in any codicies.
- L agrees with the papyrus exactly on 11 occasions, and agrees closely on 2 occasions
- f agrees with the papyrus exactly on 12 occasions and closely on 4 occasions.
- M agrees with the papyrus exactly on 12 occasions and closely on 6 occasions

Therefore f or M are the closest to the papyrus archetype.

Comparison of Toponyms: Codicies to Papyrus
Papyrus	V	L	f	M
παννονιας της κατω		παννονιας της κατω	παννονιας τ[η]ς κατω	παννονιας της κατω
σεβιτιον		σερβιτιον	σερβιτιον	σερβιτιον
μουπσεια		μουρσαλλα	μουρσα	?
σιρμιον		σιρμιον	σιρμιοη	σιρβιον
ιλλυριδος		ϊλλυριδοσχωρ	Ιλλυριδ[οσ] λιβρνι Δαλμα	ιλλυριδος [??]
ιαδερ		ϊαδερ	ιάδερα	ιαδιρα
σαλωναι		σαλωναυσιαρωναμ ?	σαλῶμαι	σαλωναι
συρδων			σιδρὼν	σιδρωνα
ναρωνα		ναρωνα	ναρξὼν ? ?	ναρωνα
σαρδωνα νησος		σκαρδωνησιανης	σαρδώνα νῆσος	
		επιδαυρος		
ϊταλιας		ϊαται	ιταλιας	ιταλιας
νικοτεραι αρικια		νικειαπασσαλιωτ	νικαια	νικαια
		πεισιαι		
		πτετεστος		
ταρακειναι	ταρραικειναι	ταρρακειναι	ταρρακιναι	ταρακιναι
νεαπολις	νεαπολις	νεαπολις	νεαπολις	νεαπολίς
ρηγιον ϊουλιον	ρηγιονϊουλιον	ρηγειονϊουλειον	ῤήγι[ον] ιούλιον	ρηγιον ϊουλιον
ταρρας	ταρας	ταρρας	τάρας	ταρας
βρεντεσιον	βρεντεσιον	βρεντεσιον	βρεντήσιον	βρεντεσι[?]ν
αγκων	ακων	αλκων	ἀγκωη	αγκων
ραουεννα	ραβεννα	ραβεννα	ρὰούεννα	ραουεννα
ακουλεια	ακυληια	ακυληϊα	ακουληία	ακουλια
πραινεστος				
πεισαι				
ρωμη	ρωμη	ρωμη	ρὤμη	ρωμη
μενουεντος		βενεβενδτορ[ο]ν	βενεβενδὸς	ουενεβενδοσ
				καπυη
			π?ενιτος	πρενεστος
			πιοσα	πεσια
καπυη		καπυη	καπυη	
κυρνου [νησου]		κουρνουαλερια	κύρνου νήσον	κυρνου νησου

== See also ==
- Handy Tables
- Almagest
- Geography (Ptolemy)
