= Geography (Ptolemy) =

Treatise on cartography by Claudius Ptolemaeus

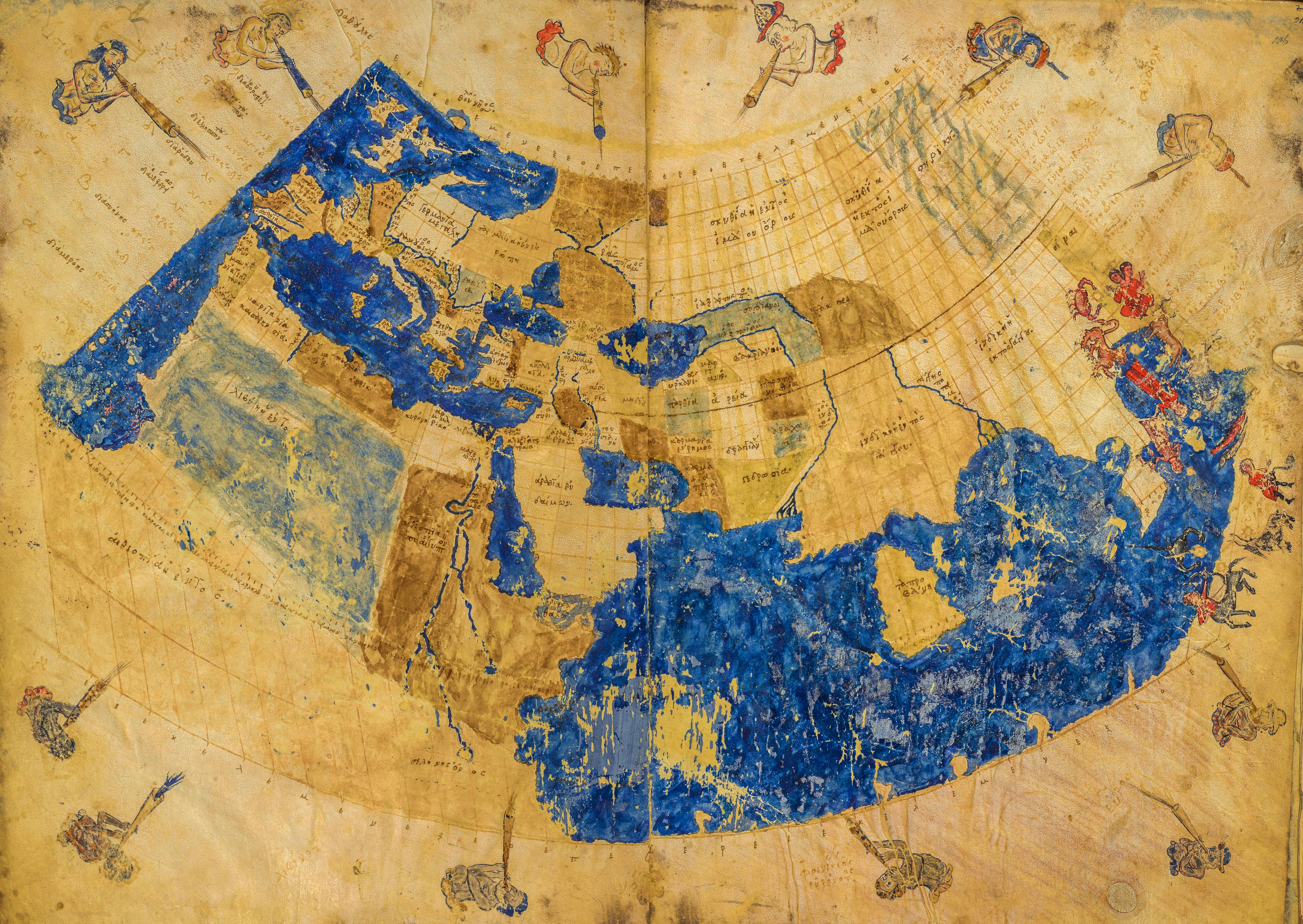
- The world map after Ptolemy's first projection from a Greek manuscript edition of the Geography (Burney MS 111, f.105v-106r)
- Author: Ptolemy
- Original title: Γεωγραφικὴ Ὑφήγησις
- Language: Ancient Greek
- Genre: Geography
- Publication date: c. 150s A.D.
- Media type: Manuscript
- Preceded by: Almagest
- Followed by: Table of Noteworthy Cities

The Geography (Ancient Greek: Γεωγραφικὴ Ὑφήγησις, Geōgraphikḕ Hyphḗgēsis, lit. "Geographical Guidance"), also known by its Latin names as the Geographia and the Cosmographia, is a gazetteer, an atlas, and a treatise on cartography, compiling the geographical knowledge of the 2nd-century Roman Empire. Originally written by Claudius Ptolemy in Greek in Alexandria around 150 AD, the work was a revision of a now-lost atlas by Marinus of Tyre using additional Roman and Persian gazetteers and new principles.

Its translation into Arabic by al-Khwarismi in the 9th century was highly influential on the geographical knowledge and cartographic traditions of the Islamic world. Alongside the works of Islamic scholars—and the commentary containing revised and more accurate data by Alfraganus—Ptolemy's work was subsequently highly influential on Medieval and Renaissance Europe.

== Manuscripts ==
Versions of Ptolemy's work in antiquity were probably proper atlases with attached maps, although some scholars believe that the references to maps in the text were later additions.

No Greek manuscript of the Geography survives from earlier than the 13th century. However fragmentary papyri of later somewhat derivative works such as the Table of Noteworthy Cities have been found with the earliest, Rylands Library GP 522, dating to the early 3rd century. A letter written by the Byzantine monk Maximus Planudes records that he searched for one for Chora Monastery in the summer of 1295; one of the earliest surviving texts may have been one of those he then assembled. In Europe, maps were sometimes redrawn using the coordinates provided by the text, as Planudes was forced to do. Later scribes and publishers could then copy these new maps, as Athanasius did for the emperor Andronicus II Palaeologus. The three earliest surviving texts with maps are those from Constantinople (Istanbul) based on Planudes's work. (Note: They are the Urbanas Graecus 82, the Fragmentum Fabricianum Graecum 23, and the Seragliensis 57. The Urbanas Graecus is usually considered the oldest, although some argue for the precedence of the Turkish manuscript.)

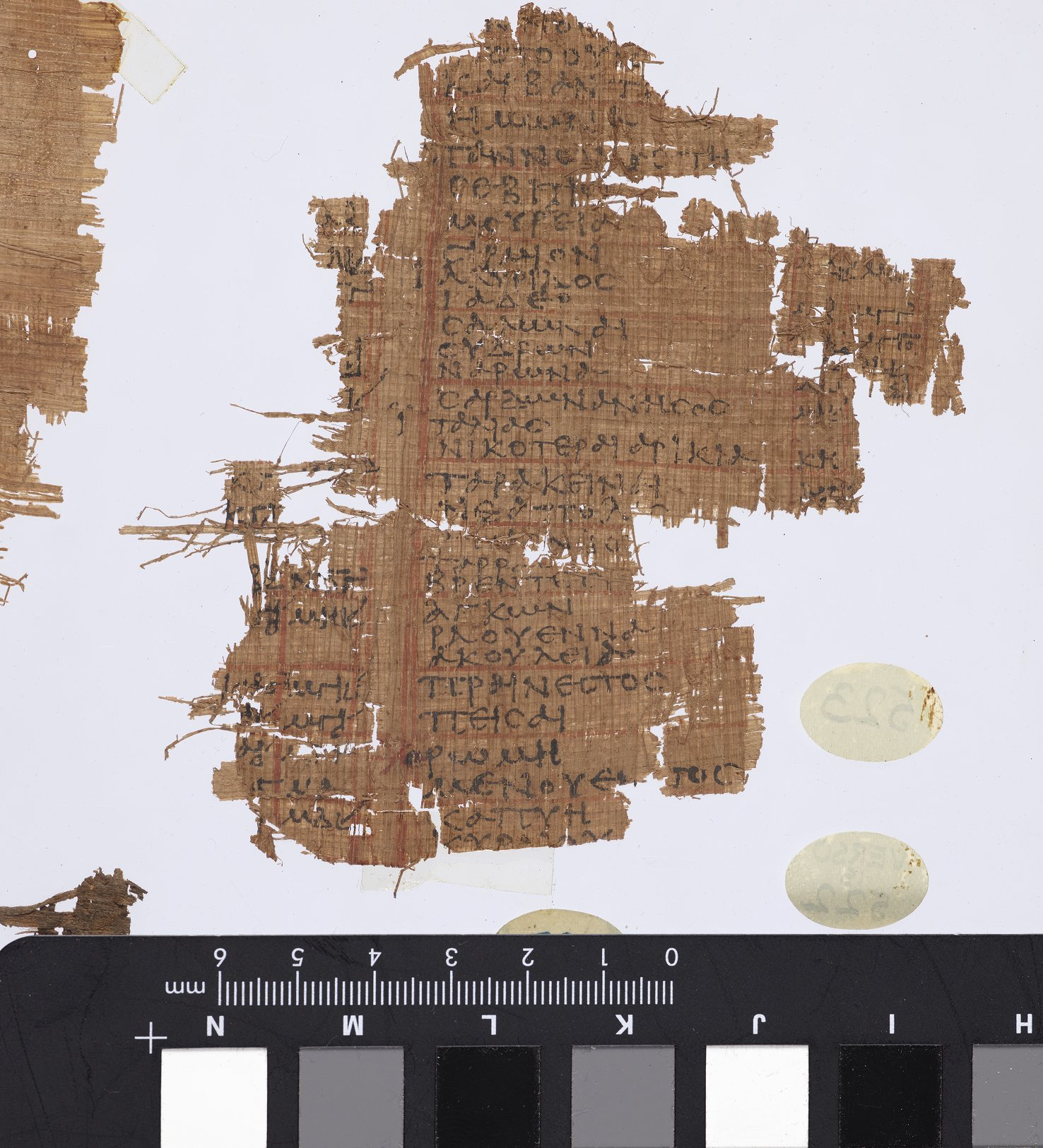
A 3rd century papyrus fragment of Ptolemy's Table of Noteworthy Cities

The first Latin translation of these texts was made in 1406 or 1407 by Jacobus Angelus in Florence, Italy, under the name Geographia Claudii Ptolemaei. It is not thought that his edition had maps, although Manuel Chrysoloras had given Palla Strozzi a Greek copy of Planudes's maps in Florence in 1397.

List of manuscripts
Repository and Collection Number	Siglum	Date	Maps	Image
Vatican Library, Vat. Gr. 191 (f.128v-169v)	X	12th-13th century	No extant maps	
Copenhagen University Library, Fragmentum Fabricianum Graecum 23	F	13th century	Fragmentary; originally world and 26 regional	
Vatican Library, Urbinas Graecus 82	U	13th century	World and 26 regional	
Istanbul Sultan's Library, Seragliensis 57	K	13th century	World and 26 regional (poorly preserved)	
Vatican Library, Vat. Gr. 177	V	13th century	No extant maps	
Laurentian Library, Plut. 28.49	O	14th century	Originally world, 1 Europe, 2 Asia, 1 Africa, 63 regional (65 maps extant)	
Bibliothèque nationale de France, Gr. Supp. 119	C	14th century	No extant maps	
Vatican Library, Vat. Gr. 178	W	14th century	No extant maps	
British Library, Burney Gr. 111	T	14th-15th century	Maps derived from Florence, Pluto 28.49	
Bodleian Library, 3376 (46)-Qu. Catal. i (Greek), Cod. Seld. 41	N	15th century	No extant maps	
Vatican Library, Pal. Gr. 388		15th century	World and 63 regional No extant maps	
Laurentian Library, Pluto 28.9 (and related manuscript 28.38)		15th century	No extant maps	
Biblioteca Marciana, Gr. 516	R	15th century	Originally world and 26 regional (world map, 2 maps, and 2 half maps missing)	
Vatican Library, Pal. Gr. 314	Z	15th century	No extant maps; written by Michael Apostolios in Crete	
British Library, Harley MS 3686		15th century		
Huntington Library, Wilton Codex		15th century	One world, ten of Europe, four of Africa, and twelve of Asia, elegantly coloured and illuminated with burnished gold.	

=== Stemma ===
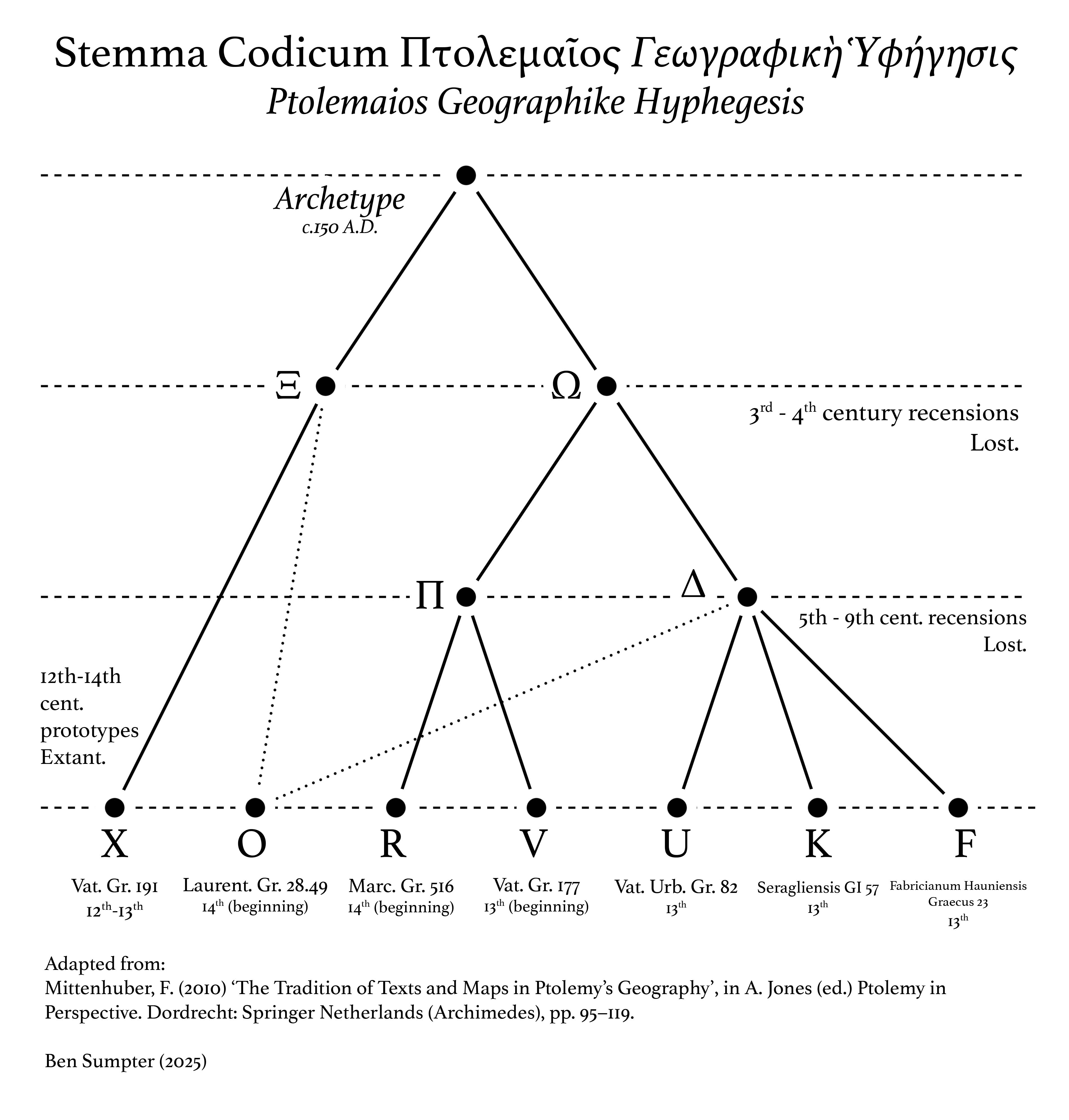
Stemma codicum of the Geography.

Berggren & Jones (2000) place these manuscripts into a stemma whereby U, K, F and N are connected with the activities of Maximos Planudes (c.1255-1305). From a sister manuscript to UKFN descends R, V, W & C, however the maps were either copied defectively or not at all. "Of the greatest importance for the text of the Geography" they state is manuscript X (Vat.Gr.191); "because it is the only copy that is uninfluenced by the Byzantine revision." e.g. the 13th-14th century corrections of Planudes, possibly associated with recreating the maps.

Regarding the maps, they conclude that it was unlikely that extant maps survived from which the above stemma descends, even if maps existed in antiquity:

"The transmission of Ptolemy's text certainly passed through a stage when the manuscripts were too small to contain the maps. Planudes and his assistants therefore probably had no pictorial models, and the success of their enterprise is proof that Ptolemy succeeded in his attempt to encode the map in words and numbers. The copies of the maps in later manuscripts and printed editions of the Geography were reproduced from Planudes' reconstructions."

Mittenhuber (2010) further divides the stemma into two recensions of the original c.AD 150 lost work: Ξ and Ω (c.3rd/4th cent., lost). Recension Ω contains most of the extant manuscripts and is subdivided into a further two groups: Δ and Π. Group Δ contains parchment manuscripts from the end of the thirteenth century, which are the earliest extant manuscripts of the Geography; these are U, K & F. Recension, Ξ, is represented by one codex only, X. Mittenhuber agrees with Berggren & Jones, stating that "The so-called Codex X is of particular significance, because it contains many local names and coordinates that differ from the other manuscripts ... which cannot be explained by mere errors in the tradition.". Although no manuscripts survive from earlier than the late 13th century; there are references to the existence of ancient codicies in late antiquity. One such example is in an epistle by Cassiodorus (c.560 A.D.):

"Tum, si vos notitiae nobilis cura inflammaverit, habetis Ptolemaei codicem, qui sic omnia loca evidenter expressit, ut eum cunctarum regionum paene incolam fuisse iudicetis. Eoque fit, ut uno loco positi, sicut monachos decet, animo percurratis, quod aliquorum peregrinatio plurimo labore collegit."(Institutiones 1, 25).

The existence of ancient recensions that differ fundamentally to the surviving manuscript tradition can be seen in the epitomes of Markianos by Stephanus:

"Καὶ ἄλλοι οὕτως διὰ του π Πρετανίδες νῆσοι, ὡς Μαρκιανὸς καὶ Πτολεμαῖος."

The tradition preserved within the stemma of surviving (13th-14th century) manuscripts by Stückelberger & Grasshoff only preserves "Β" and not "Π" recentions of "Βρεττανικήσ".

== Contents ==
The Geography consists of three sections, divided among 8 books. Book I is a treatise on cartography and chorography, describing the methods used to assemble and arrange Ptolemy's data. From Book II through the beginning of Book VII, a gazetteer provides longitude and latitude values for the world known to the ancient Romans (the "ecumene"). The rest of Book VII provides details on three projections to be used for the construction of a map of the world, varying in complexity and fidelity. Book VIII constitutes an atlas of regional maps. The maps include a recapitulation of some of the values given earlier in the work, which were intended to be used as captions to clarify the map's contents and maintain their accuracy during copying. Book 8 formed the basis for the Table of Noteworthy Cities.

=== Cartographical treatise ===
Maps based on scientific principles had been made in Europe since the time of Eratosthenes in the 3rd century BC. Ptolemy improved the treatment of map projections. He provided instructions on how to create his maps in the first section of the work.

=== Gazetteer ===
The gazetteer section of Ptolemy's work provided latitude and longitude coordinates for all the places and geographical features in the work. Latitude was expressed in degrees of arc from the equator, the same system that is used now, though Ptolemy used fractions of a degree rather than minutes of arc. His Prime Meridian, of 0 longitude, ran through the Fortunate Isles, the westernmost land recorded, at around the position of El Hierro in the Canary Islands. The maps spanned 180 degrees of longitude from the Fortunate Isles in the Atlantic to China.

Ptolemy was aware that Europe knew only about a quarter of the globe.

=== Atlas ===
Ptolemy's work included a single large and less detailed world map and then separate and more detailed regional maps. The first Greek manuscripts compiled after Maximus Planudes's rediscovery of the text had as many as 64 regional maps. (Note: For example, the illustrations for British Library, Burney MS 111, most of which were inserted into an earlier copy of the Geography during the early 15th century.) The standard set in Western Europe came to be 26: 10 European maps, 4 African maps, and 12 Asian maps. As early as the 1420s, these canonical maps were complemented by extra-Ptolemaic regional maps depicting, e.g., Scandinavia.

== Chapters ==
The Geography is spread over 8 books with the main body of the work (books 2-7) is a list of some 8000 toponyms comprising the Oikumene of the second century AD. Book 1 is written in prose and is Ptolemy's explanation of the project, his method and his sources (mainly Marinos of Tyre). Book 8 offers descriptions for each of the maps created in books 2-7 and forms the basis of the Table of Noteworthy Cities. The critical edition was published by Stückelberger, Mittenhuber and Klöti (2006).

=== Book 1 ===
Book 1 is a theoretical treatise by Ptolemy outlining the subject matter, previous work and instructing the reader how to draw a world map using his projection systems. The sections are, to use Ptolemy's original titles:

1. On the difference between world cartography and regional cartography
2. On the prerequisites for world cartography
3. How the number of stades in the earth's circumference can be obtained from the number of stades in an arbitrary rectilinear interval, and vice versa, even if [the interval] is not on a single meridian
4. That it is necessary to give priority to the [astronomical] phenomena over [data] from records of travel
5. That it is necessary to follow the most recent researches because of changes in the world over time
6. On Marinos' guide to world cartography
7. Revision of Marinos' latitudinal dimension of the known world on the basis of the [astronomical] phenomena
8. The same revision [of the latitudinal dimension], on the basis of land journeys
9. The same revision [of the latitudinal dimension], on the basis of sea journeys
10. That one should not put the Aithiopians south of the parallel situated opposite to that through Meroe
11. On the computations that Marinos improperly made for the longitudinal dimension of the oikoumene
12. The revision of the longitudinal dimension of the known world on the basis of journeys by land
13. The same revision [of the longitudinal dimension] on the basis of journeys by sea
14. On the crossing from the Golden Peninsula to Kattigara
15. On the inconsistencies in details of Marinos' exposition
16. That certain matters escaped [Marinos'] notice in the boundaries of the provinces
17. On the inconsistencies between [Marinos] and the reports ofour time
18. On the inconvenience of Marinos' compilations for drawing a map of the oikoumene
19. On the convenience of our catalogue for making a map
20. On the disproportional nature of Marinos' geographical map
21. On the things that should be preserved in a planar map
22. On how one should make a map of the oikoumene on a globe
23. List of the meridians and parallels to be included in the map
24. Method of making a map of the oikoumene in the plane in proper proportionality with its configuration on the globe (In this section Ptolemy explains two methods for projecting his map)

=== Book 2 ===
Western Atlantic fringes, Gaul, Central Europe and the Iberian Peninsula.

Chapter	Region
Prologue	
1	Britannia: Hibernia
2	Britannia: Albion
3	Hispanic Baetica
4	Hispanic Tarraconensis
5	Hispanic Lusitania
6	Aquitanian Gaul
7	Lugdunensian Gaul
8	Belgic Gaul
9	Narbonensian Gaul
10	Greater Germania
11	Raetia and Vindelica
12	Noricum
13	Upper Pannonia
14	Lower Pannonia
15	Illyria or Liburnia and Dalmatia

=== Book 3 ===
Italy, Greece and the major Mediterranean Islands.

Chapter	Region
1	Italy
2	Corsica
3	Sardinia
4	Sicily
5	Sarmatia
6	Tauric Peninsula
7	Iazyges Metanastae
8	Dacia
9	Upper Moesia
10	Lower Moesia
11	Thracia and the Peloponnesian Peninsula
12	Macedonia
13	Epirus
14	Achaia
15	Crete

=== Book 4 ===
North Africa from Morocco to Egypt, along the Mediterranean coastline.

Chapter	Region
1	Mauritania Tingitana (Morocco)
2	Mauritania Caesariensis (parts of Morocco and Algeria)
3	Numidia and Africa (parts of Algeria and Tunisia)
4	Cyrenaica (Crete and Libya)
5	Marmarica, which is properly called Libya, and Egypt
6	Libya Interior
7	Below Egypt
8	Aethiopia, in the interior below

=== Book 5 ===
Covering Anatolia, Asia Minor, the Levant and Near East (including Cyprus).

Chapter	Region
1	Bithynia and Pontus
2	Asia
3	Lycia
4	Pamphylia
5	Galatia
6	Cappadocia
7	Cilicia
8	Asiatic Sarmatia
9	Colchis
10	Iberia
11	Albania
12	Greater Armenia
13	Cyprus
14	Syria
15	Palestine
16	Arabia Petraea
17	Mesopotamia
18	Arabia Deserta
19	Babylonia

=== Book 6 ===
In book 6, Ptolemy covers the Near East, the Caucuses, and Central Asia.

Chapter	Region
1	Assyria
2	Media
3	Susiane
4	Persis
5	Parthia
6	Karmania
7	Eudaimon Arabia
8	Karmianien
9	Hyrkanien
10	Margiane
11	Bactriane
12	Sogdianer
13	Saken
14	Skythia
15	Skythia
16	Serike
17	Areia
18	Paropanisaden
19	Drangiana
20	Archosien
21	Gedrosien

=== Book 7 ===
India, China, and Sri Lanka.

Chapter	Description
1	India before the Ganges
2	India beyond the Ganges
3	Land of Sinen
4	Taprobane
5	Summary caption of the map of the oikoumene
6	The mapping of a ringed globe with the oikoumene
7	Caption for the flattening [of the oikoumene]

=== Book 8 ===
Descriptions of the maps created by the previous sections with details of day length at solstice, etc. The gazetter of toponyms is thought to have formed the basis for the Table of Noteworthy Cities.

Chapter	Description
1	On the basis for dividing the oikoumene into the [regional] maps
2	Which things are appropriate to include in the caption for each map
3	Europe Map 1
4	Europe Map 2
5	Europe Map 3
6	Europe Map 4
7	Europe Map 5
8	Europe Map 6
9	Europe Map 7
10	Europe Map 8
11	Europe Map 9
12	Europe Map 10
13	Africa Map 1
14	Africa Map 2
15	Africa Map 3
16	Africa Map 4
17	Asia Map 1
18	Asia Map 2
19	Asia Map 3
20	Asia Map 4
21	Asia Map 5
22	Asia Map 6
23	Asia Map 7
24	Asia Map 8
25	Asia Map 9
26	Asia Map 10
27	Asia Map 11
28	Asia Map 12
29	Directory of the lands of the oikoumene
30	List of length and width of individual maps

=== Image Gallery ===
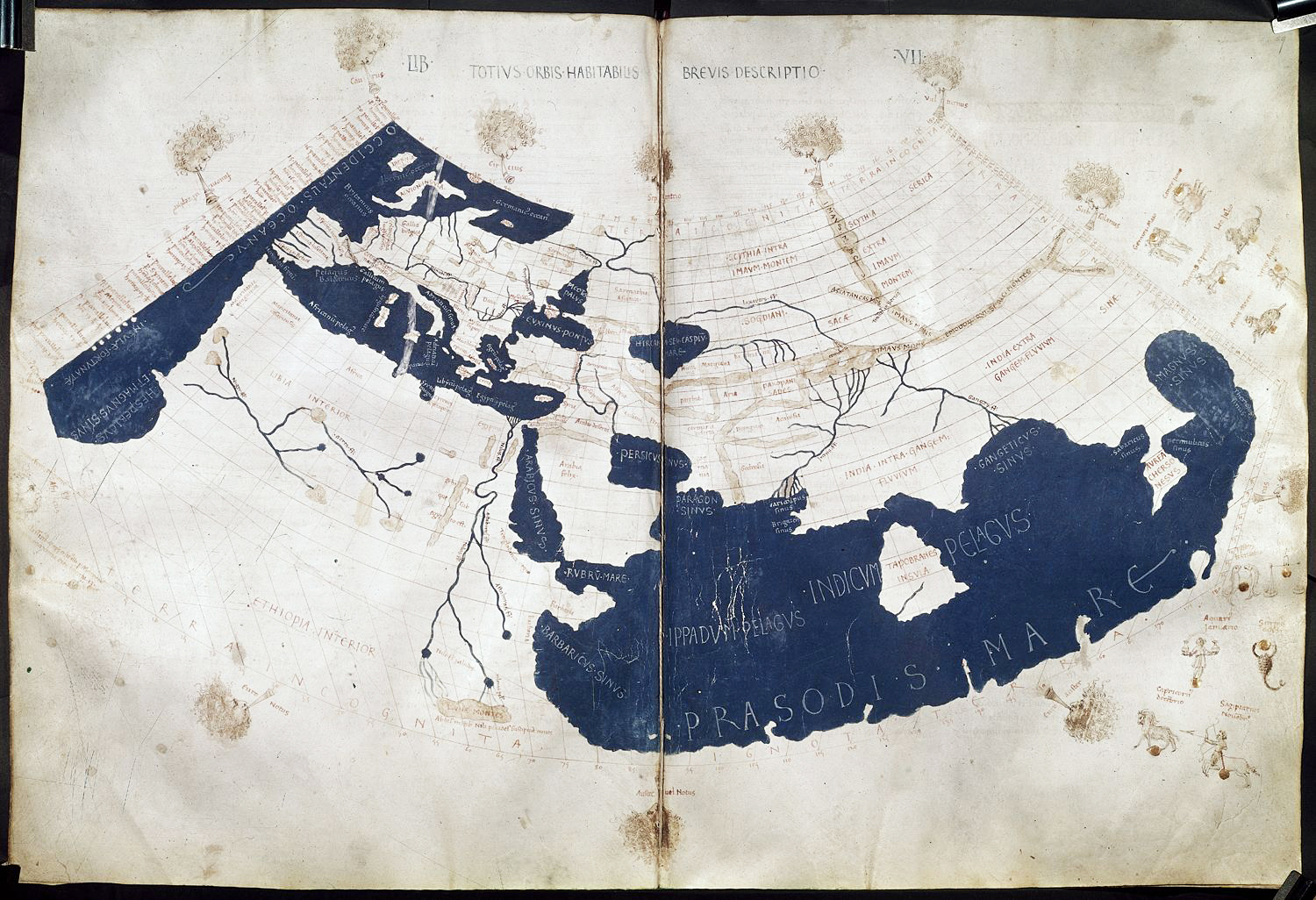
The Ptolemy world map – which extended to Serica and Cattigara, beyond Sri Lanka and the Malay Peninsula
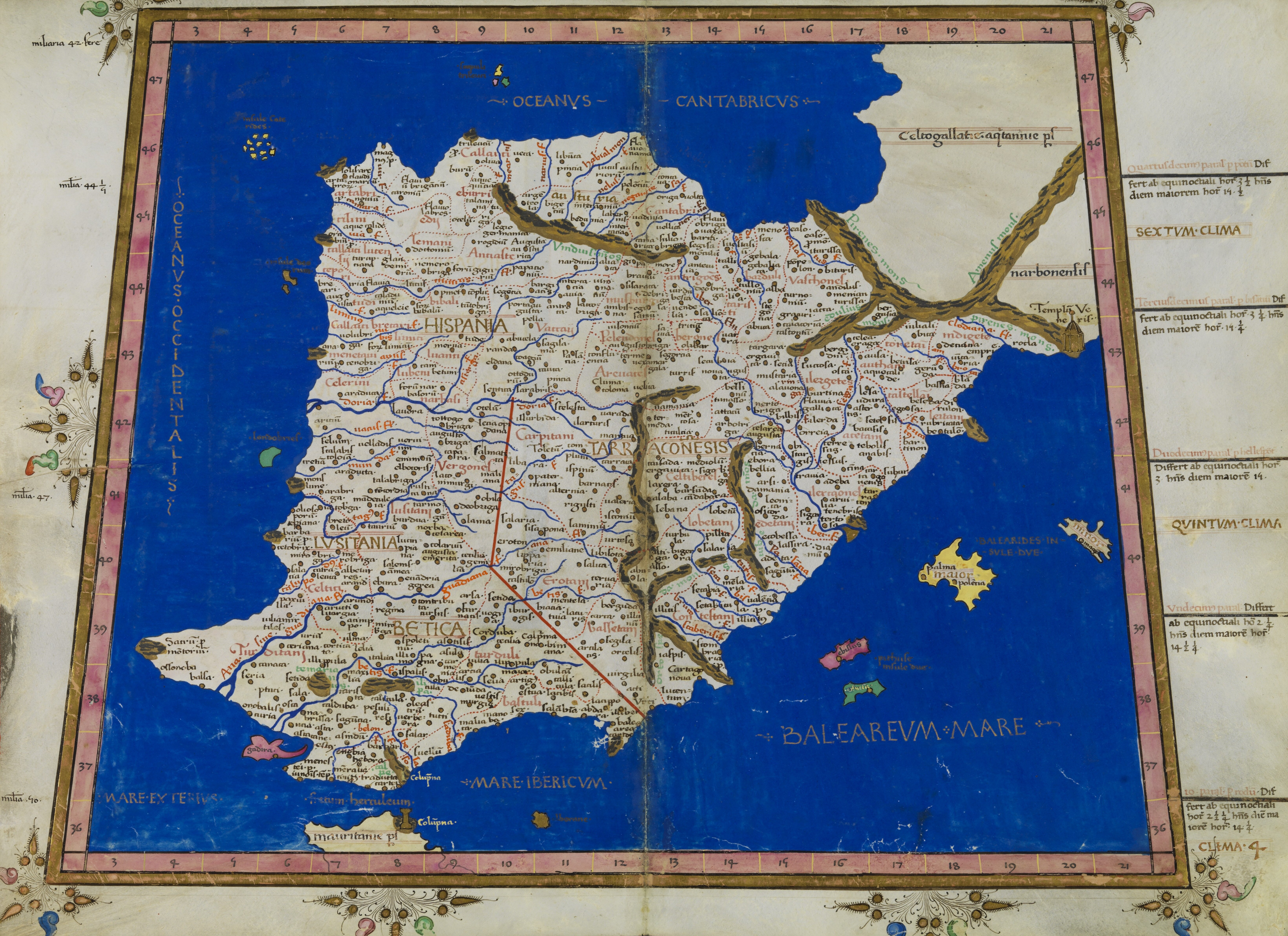
2nd Map of Europe
Hispania Tarraconensis, Baetica, and Lusitania

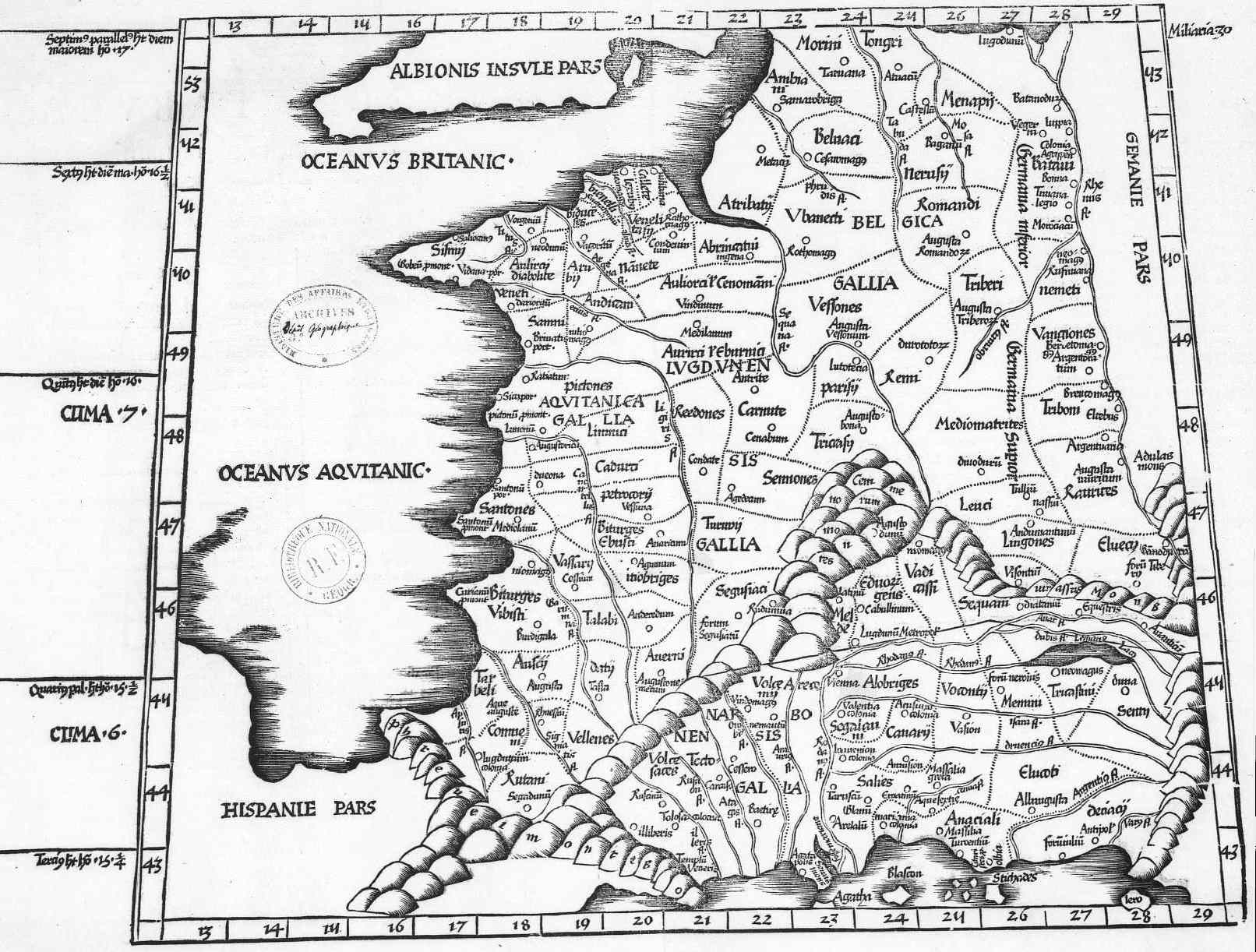
3rd Map of Europe
Gallia Lugdunensis, Narbonensis, and Belgica

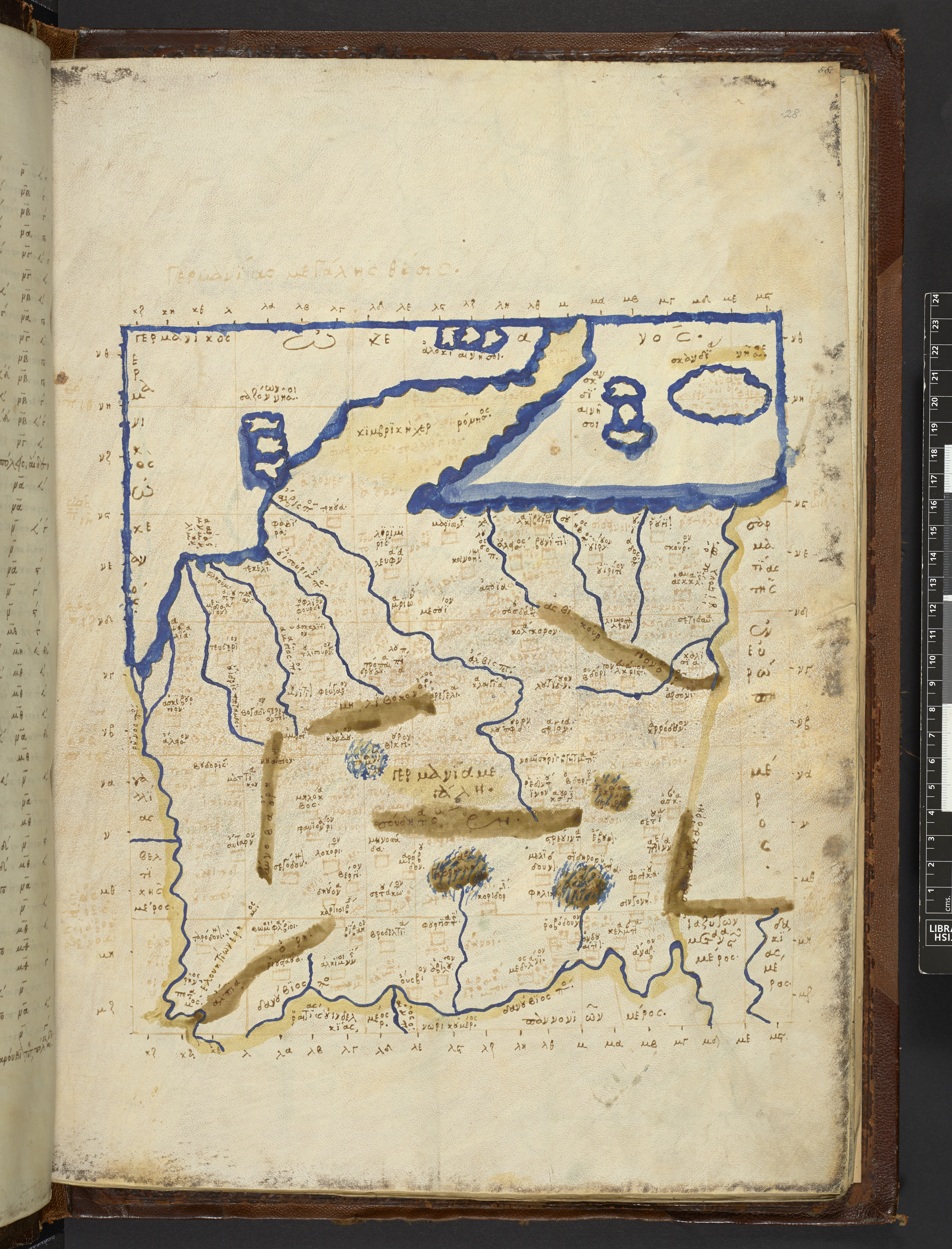
4th Map of Europe
Greater Germany and the Cimbric Peninsula

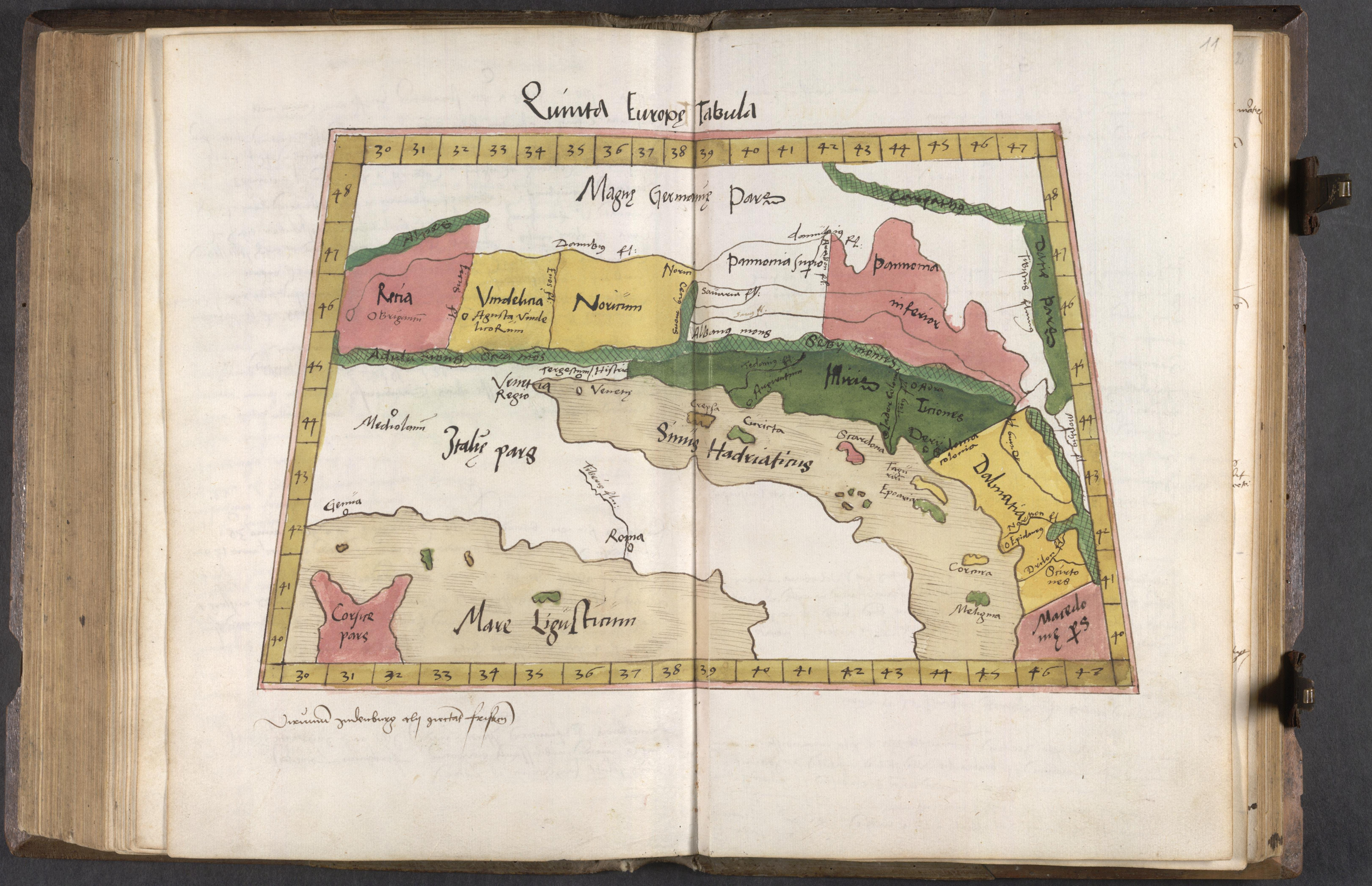
5th Map of Europe
Rhaetia, Vindelicia, Noricum, Pannonia, Illyria, Liburnia, and Dalmatia

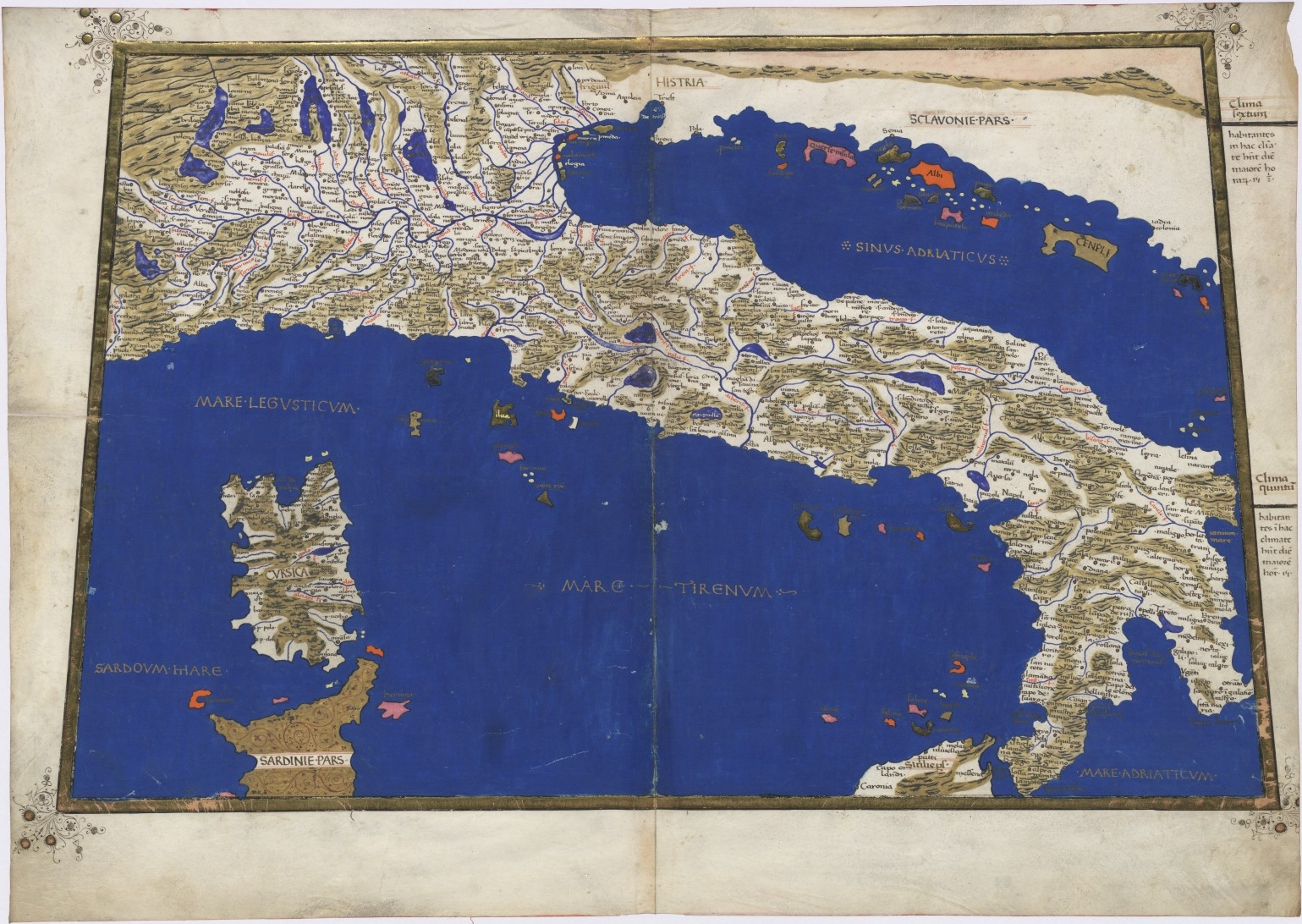
6th Map of Europe
Italy and Corsica

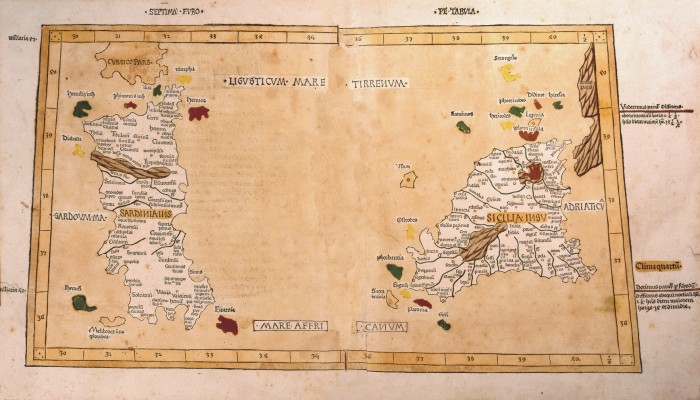
7th Map of Europe
Sardinia and Sicily

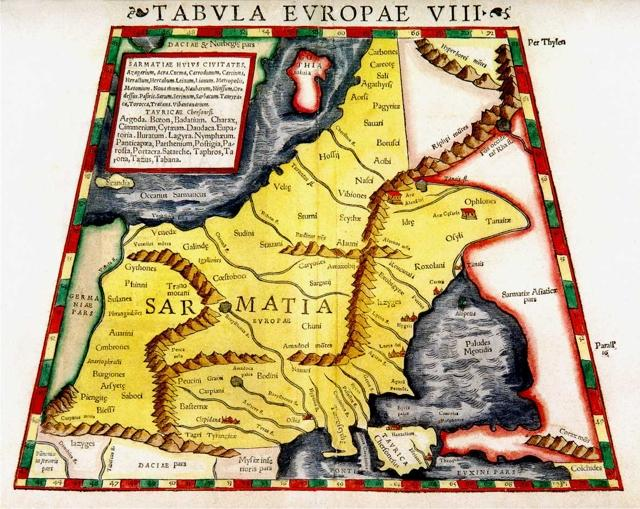
8th Map of Europe
Sarmatia in Europe

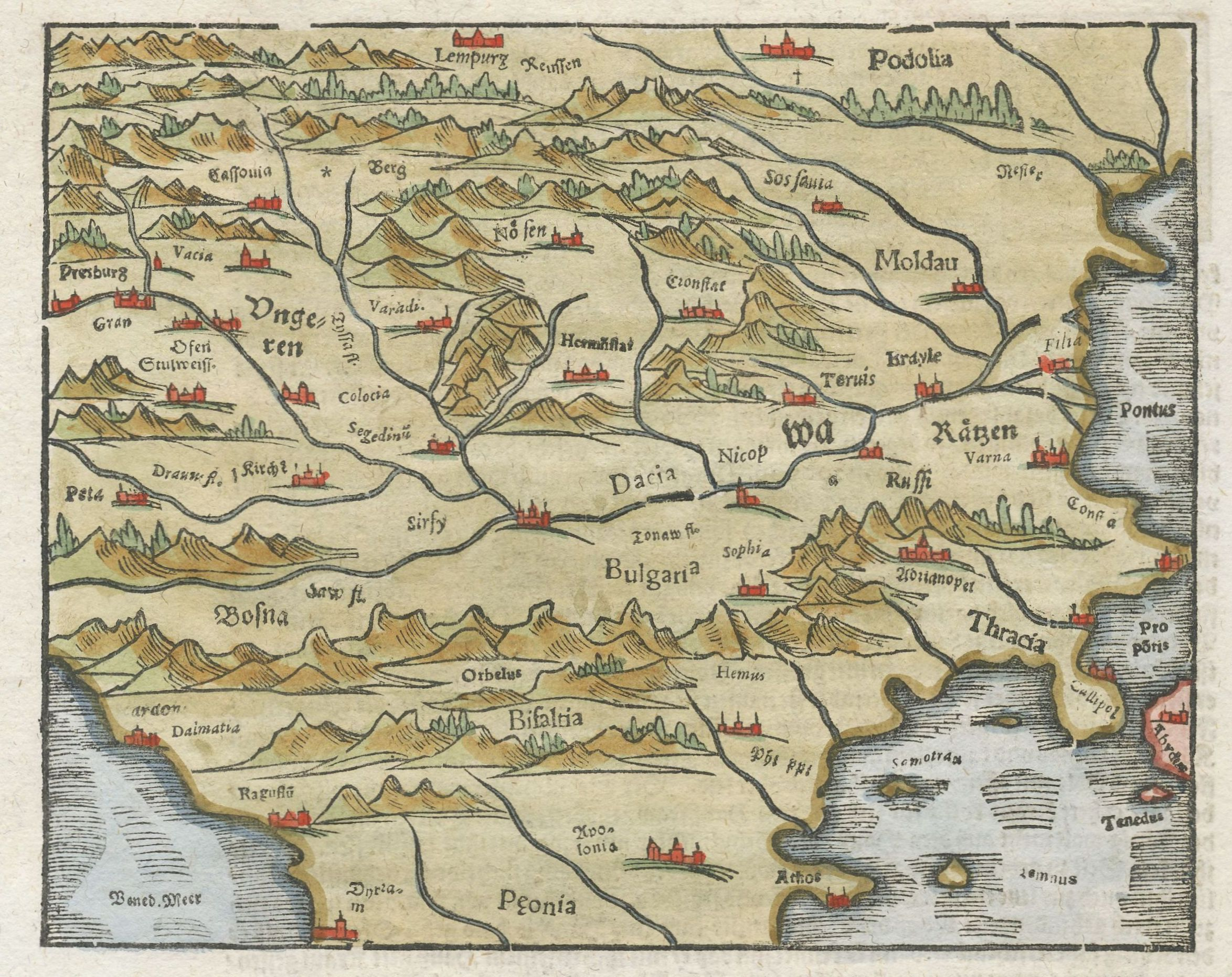
9th Map of Europe
Dacia, Moesia, and Thrace

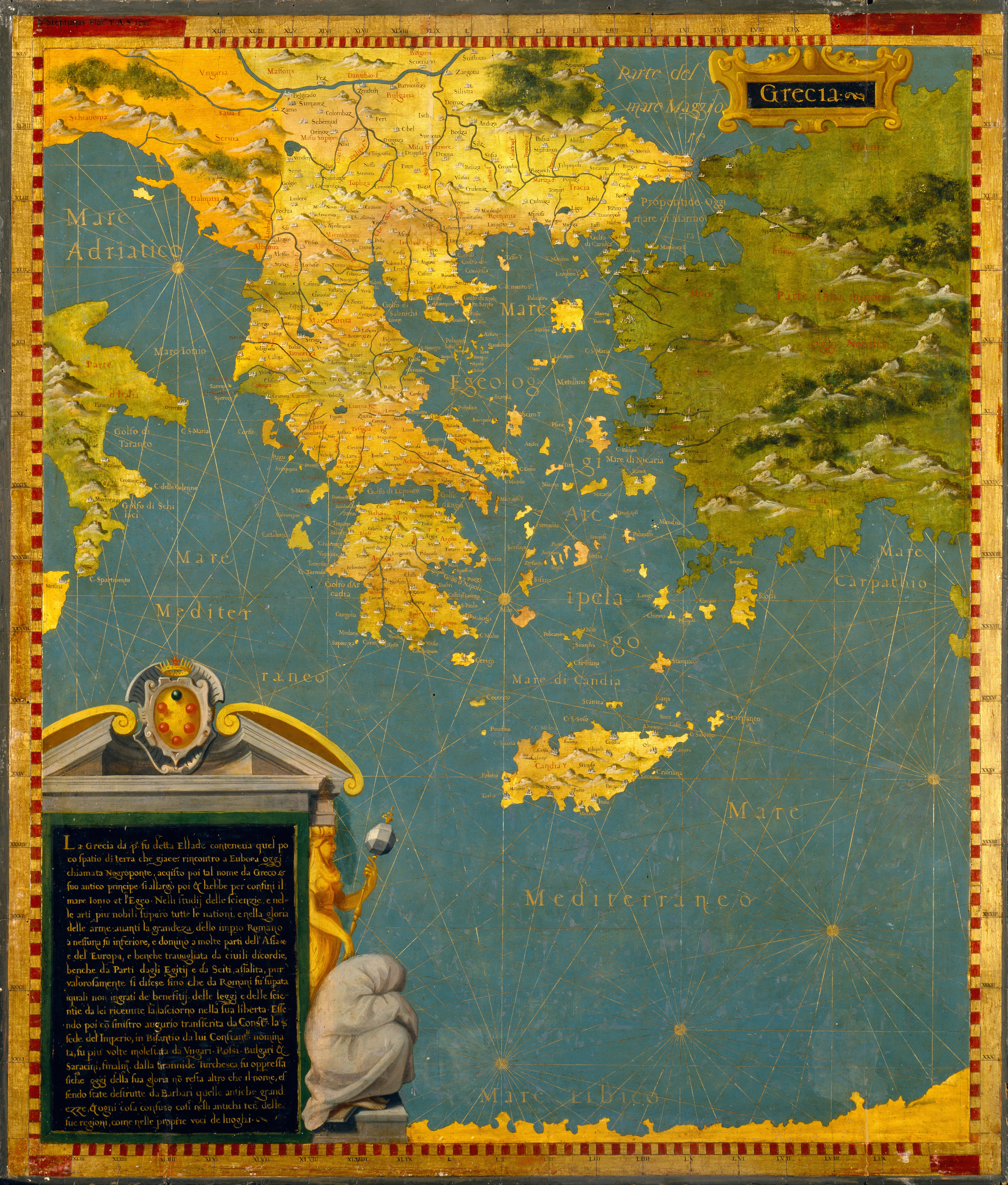
10th Map of Europe
Macedonia, Achaea, the Peloponnesus, and Crete
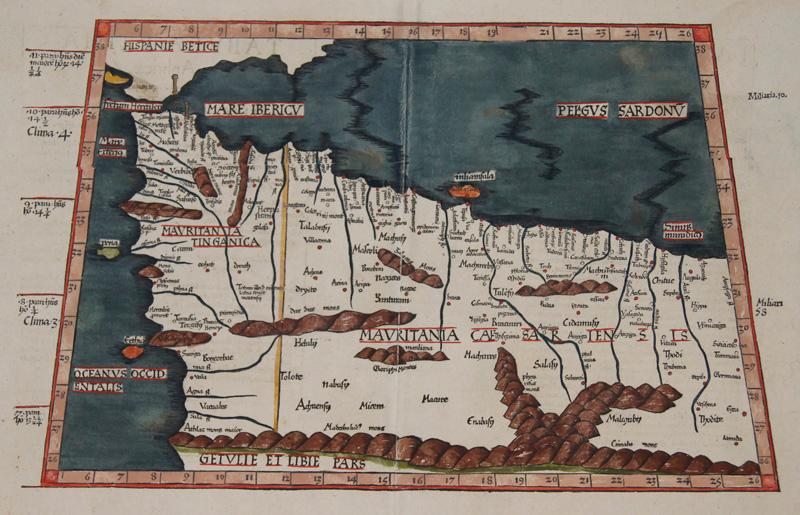
1st Map of North Africa
Mauretania Tingitana and Mauretania Caesariensis (Morocco and western Algeria)

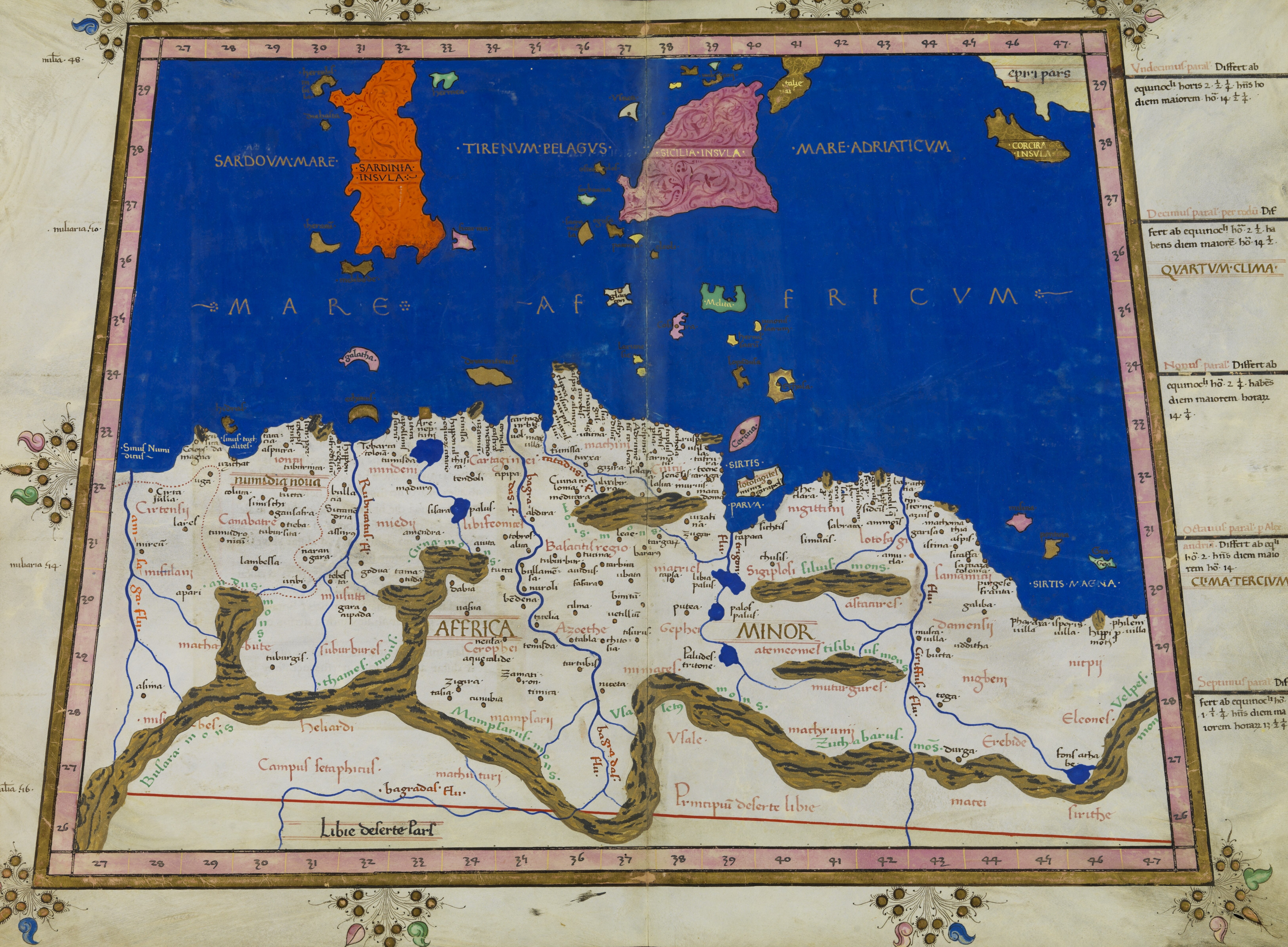
2nd Map of North Africa
Numidia and Africa (Roman province) (Algeria, Tunisia, and Tripolitana)

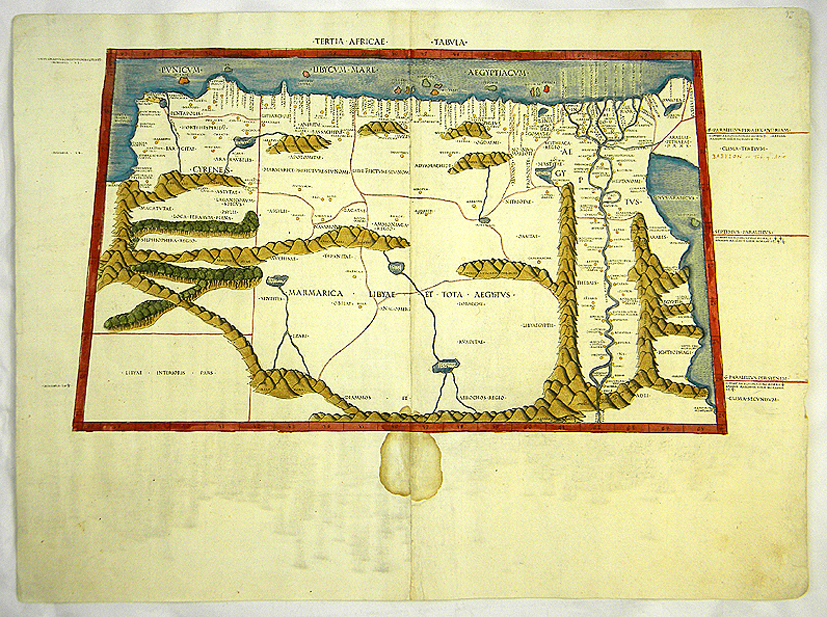
3rd Map of North Africa
Cyrenaica, Marmarica, Libya, Lower Egypt, and the Thebaid

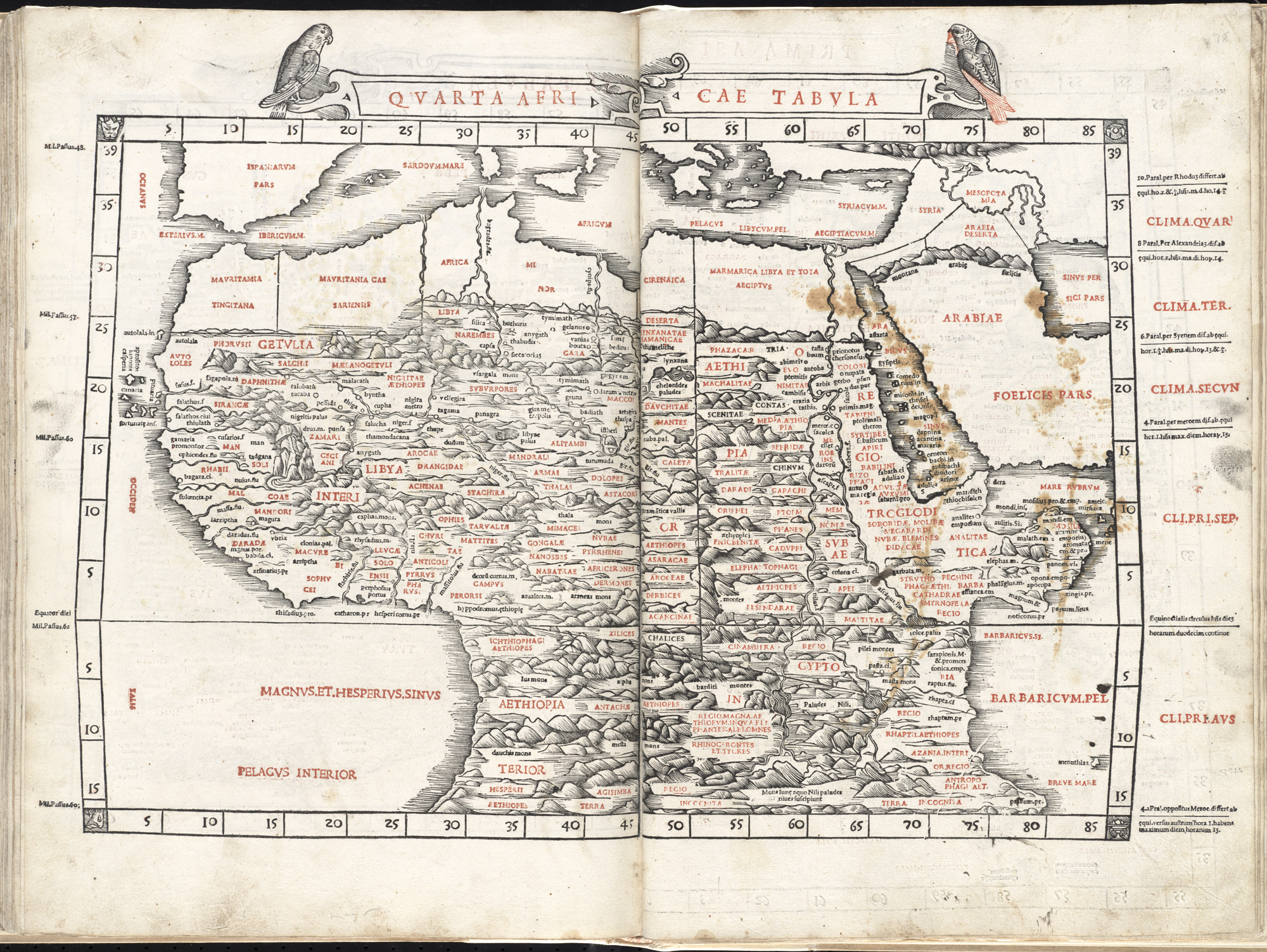
4th Map of Africa
North Africa, and certain regions of sub-Saharan Africa (including the Sahel and the Horn of Africa)
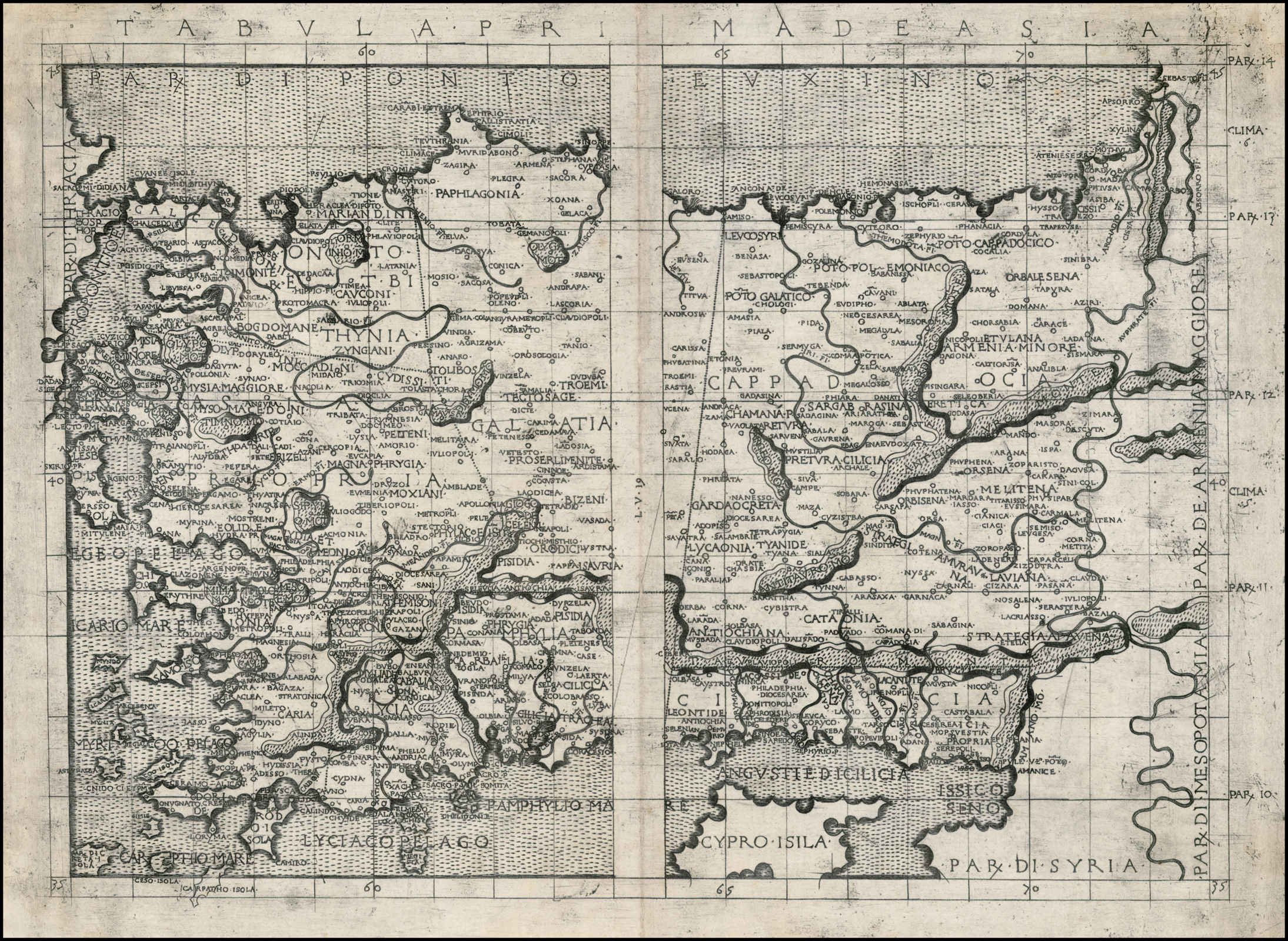
1st Map of West Asia
Bithynia and Pontus, Asia, Lycia, Pamphylia, Galatia, Cappadocia, Cilicia, and Lesser Armenia

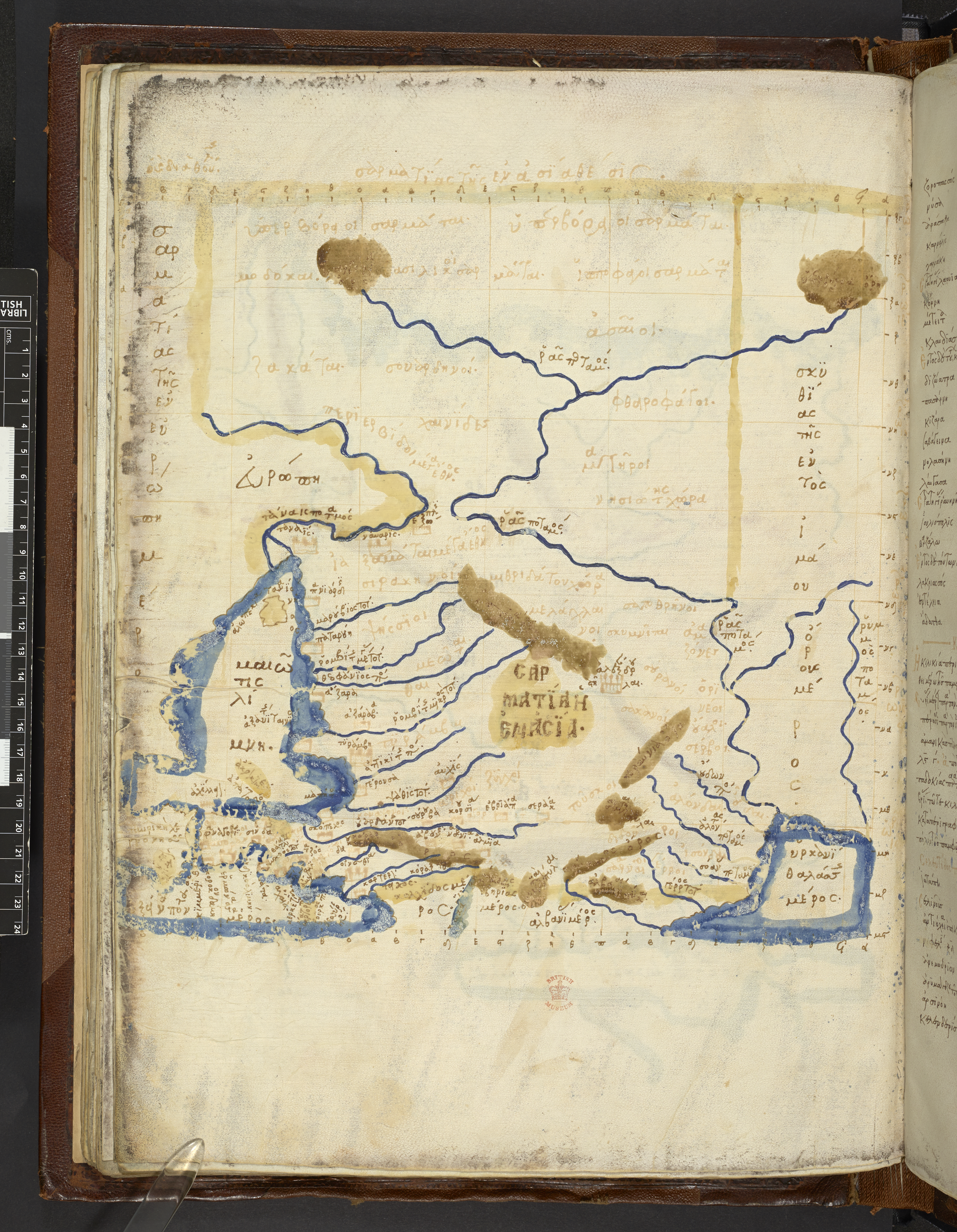
2nd Map of Asia
Asiatic Sarmatia

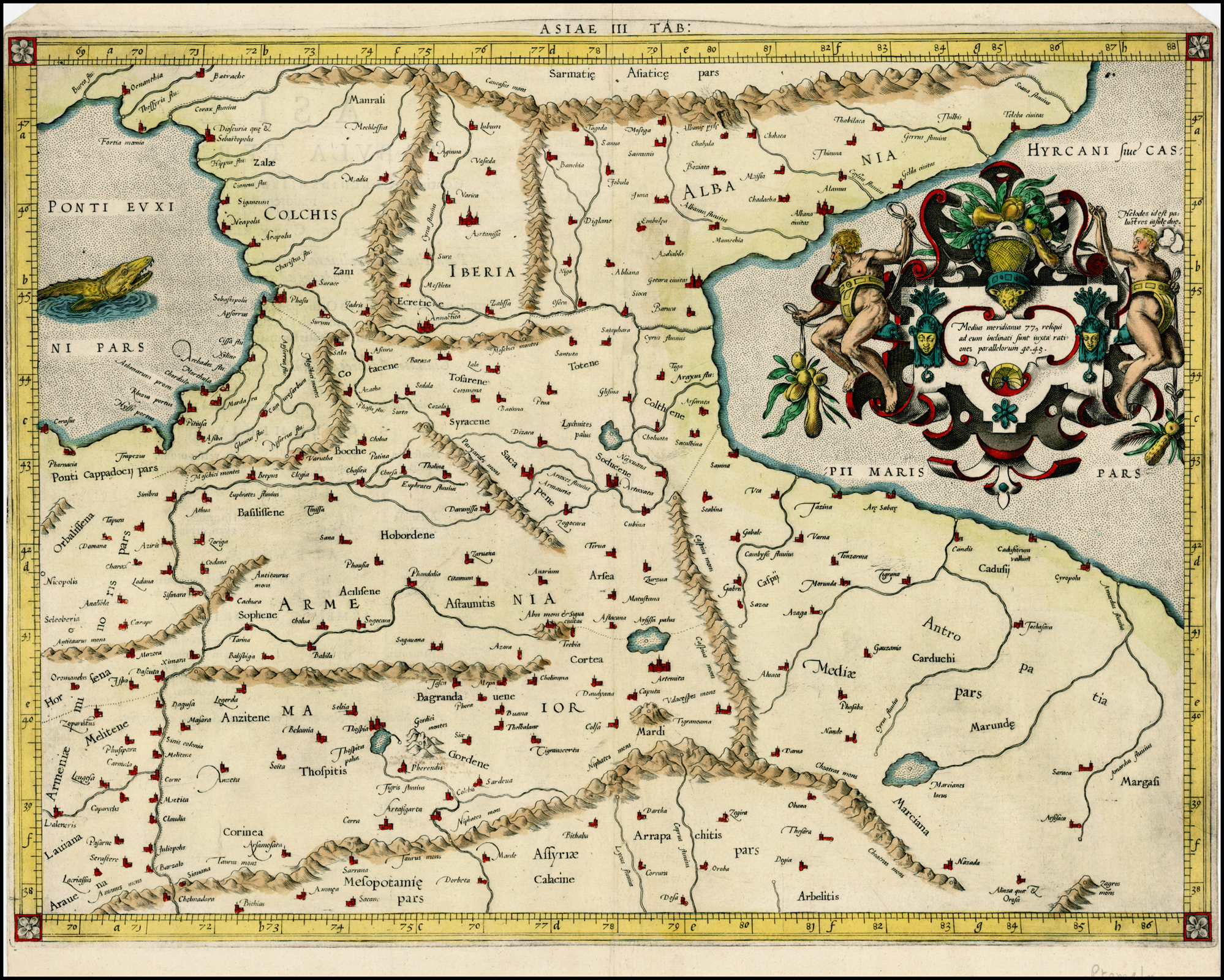
3rd Map of West Asia
Colchis, Iberia, Albania, and Greater Armenia

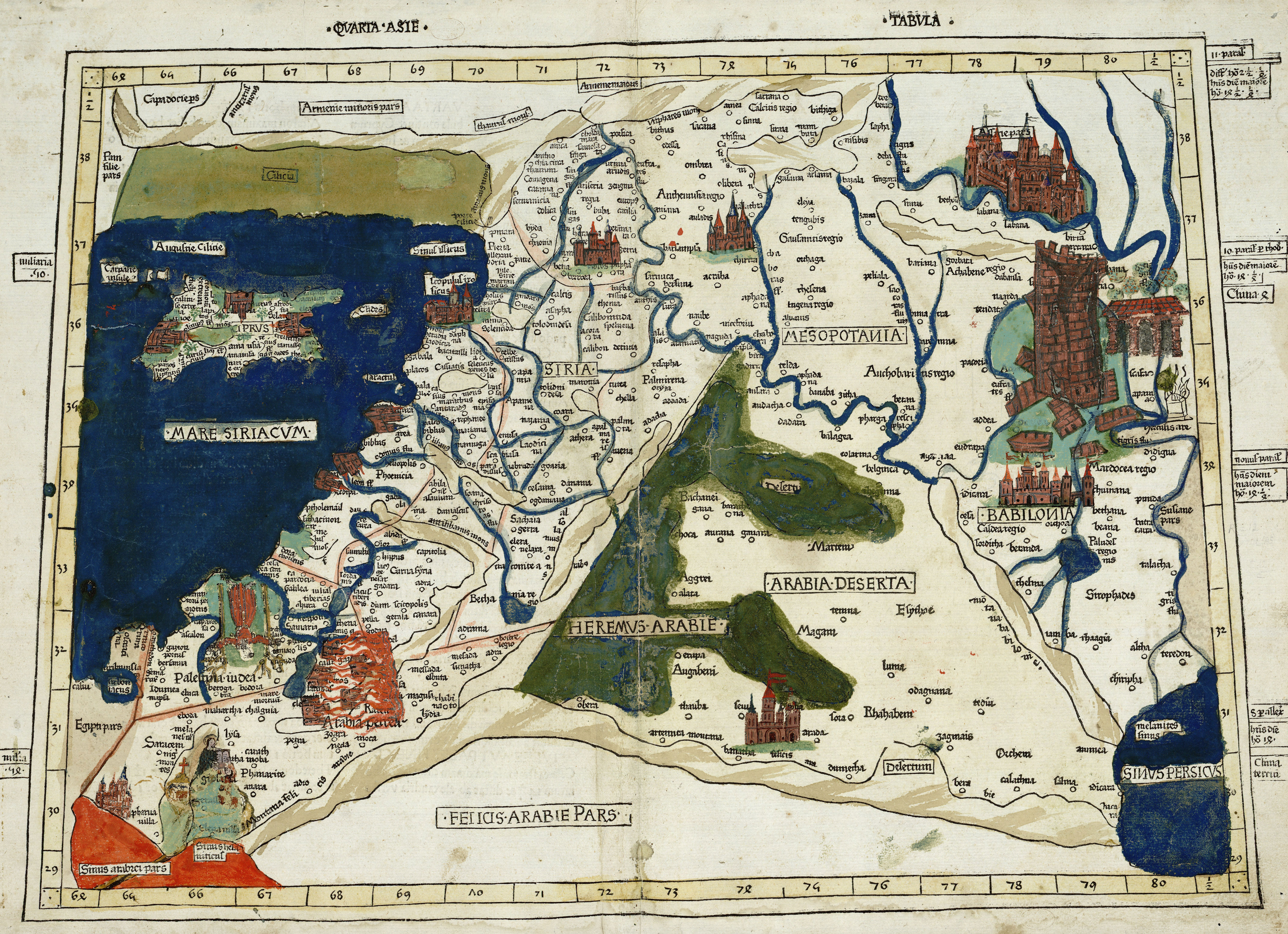
4th Map of West Asia
Cyprus, Syria, Palestine/Judea, Arabia Petrea and Deserta, Mesopotamia, and Babylonia

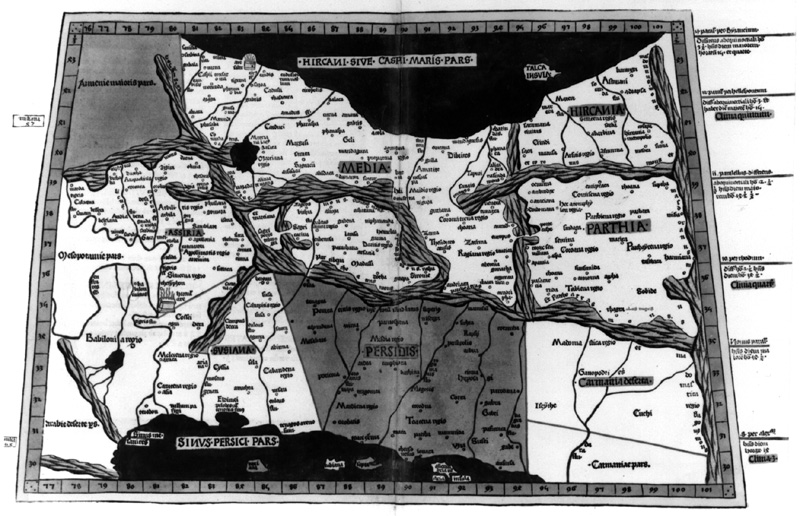
5th Map of Asia
Assyria, Susiana, Media, Persia, Hyrcania, Parthia, and Carmania Deserta

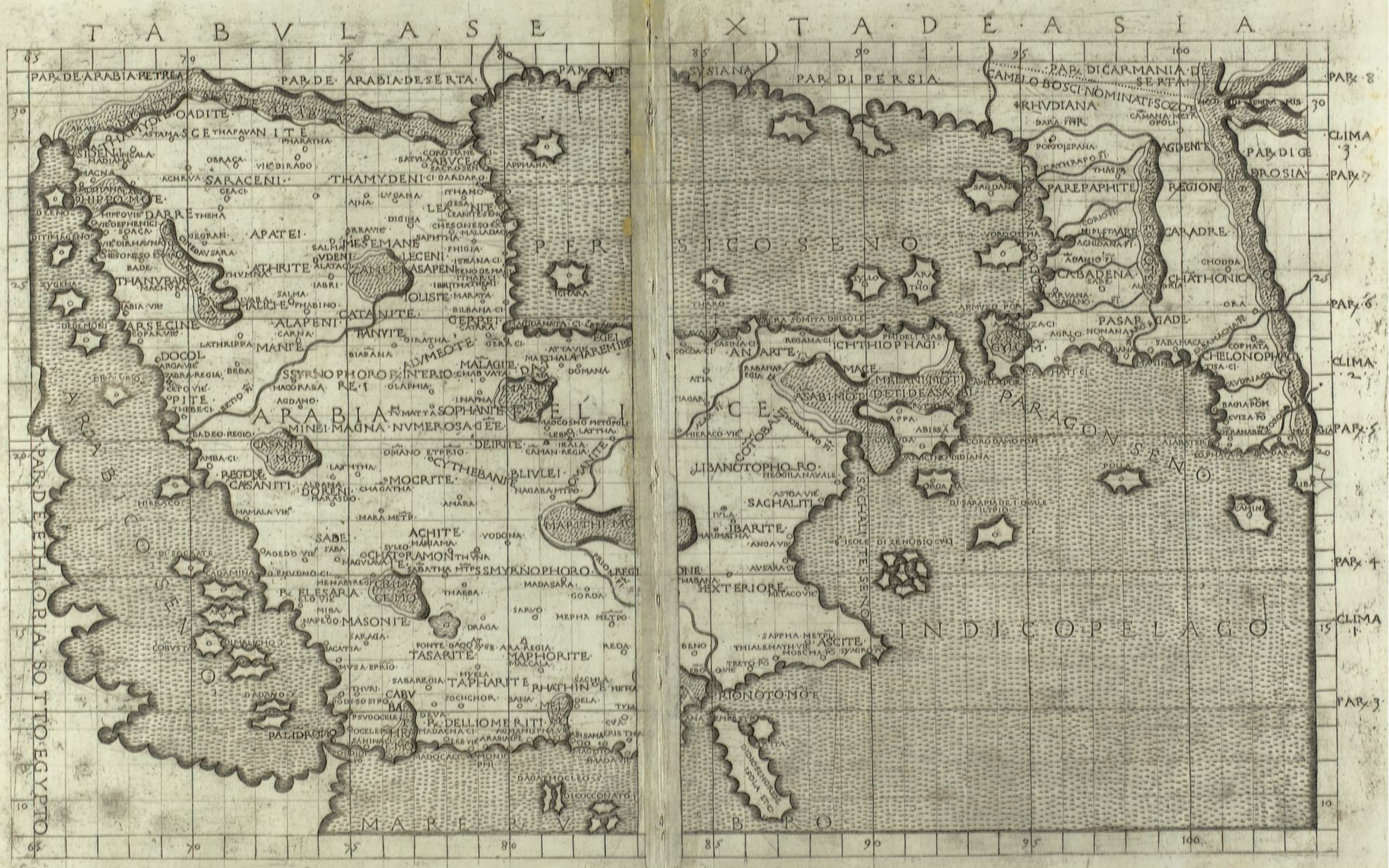
6th Map of Asia
Arabia Felix and Carmania Deserta

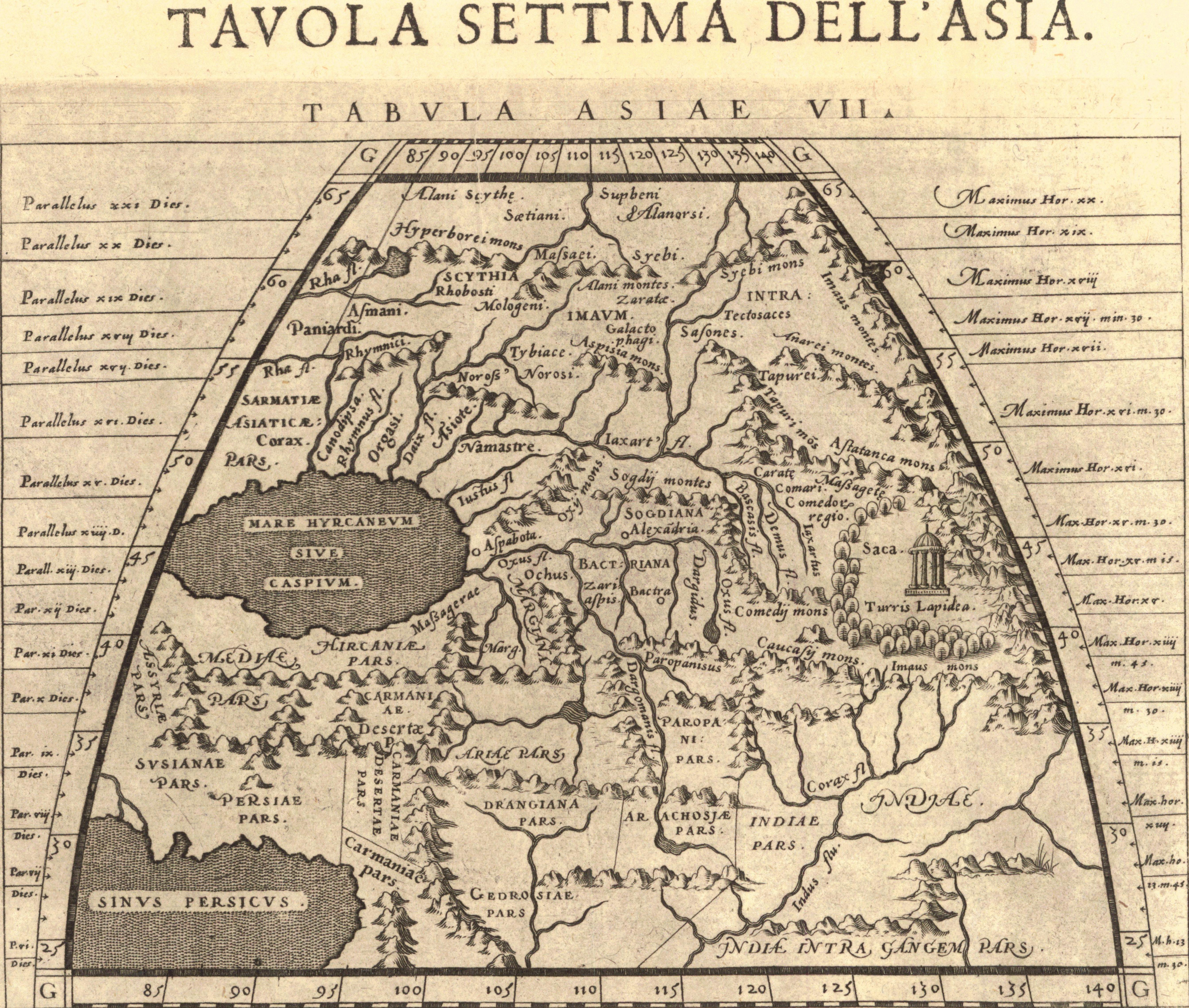
7th Map of Asia
Scythia within Imaus, Sogdiana, Bactriana, Margiana, and the Sacae

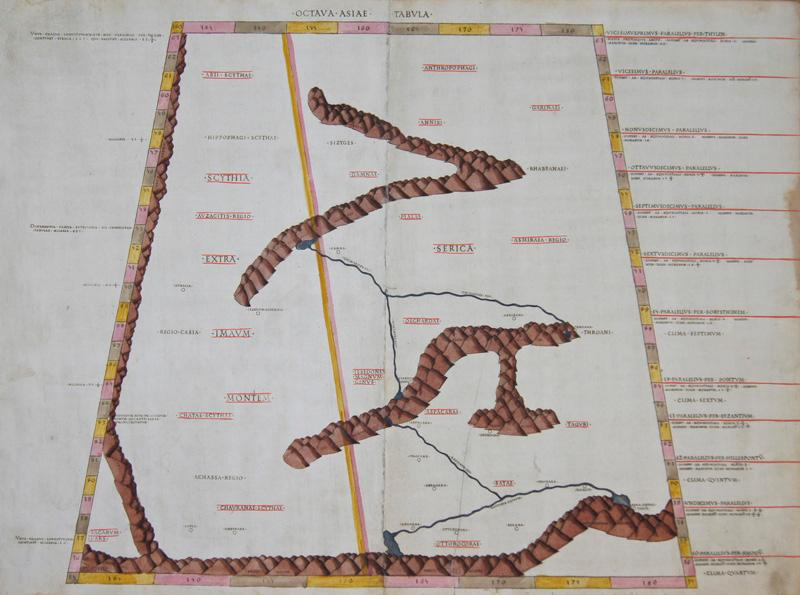
8th Map of Asia
Scythia beyond Imaus and Serica

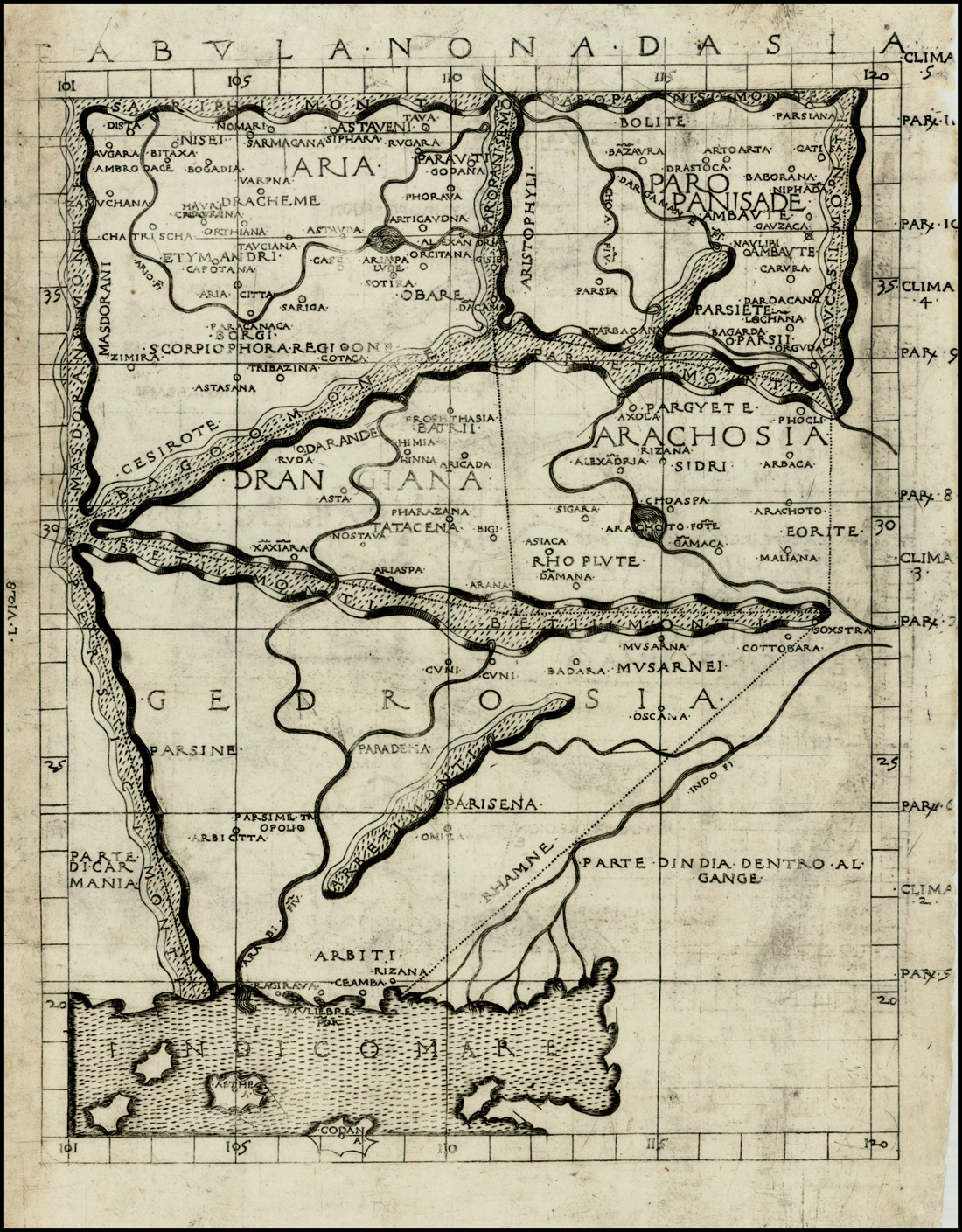
9th Map of Asia
Ariana, Drangiana, Gedrosia, Arachosia, and Paropanisus

10th Map of Asia
India within the Ganges

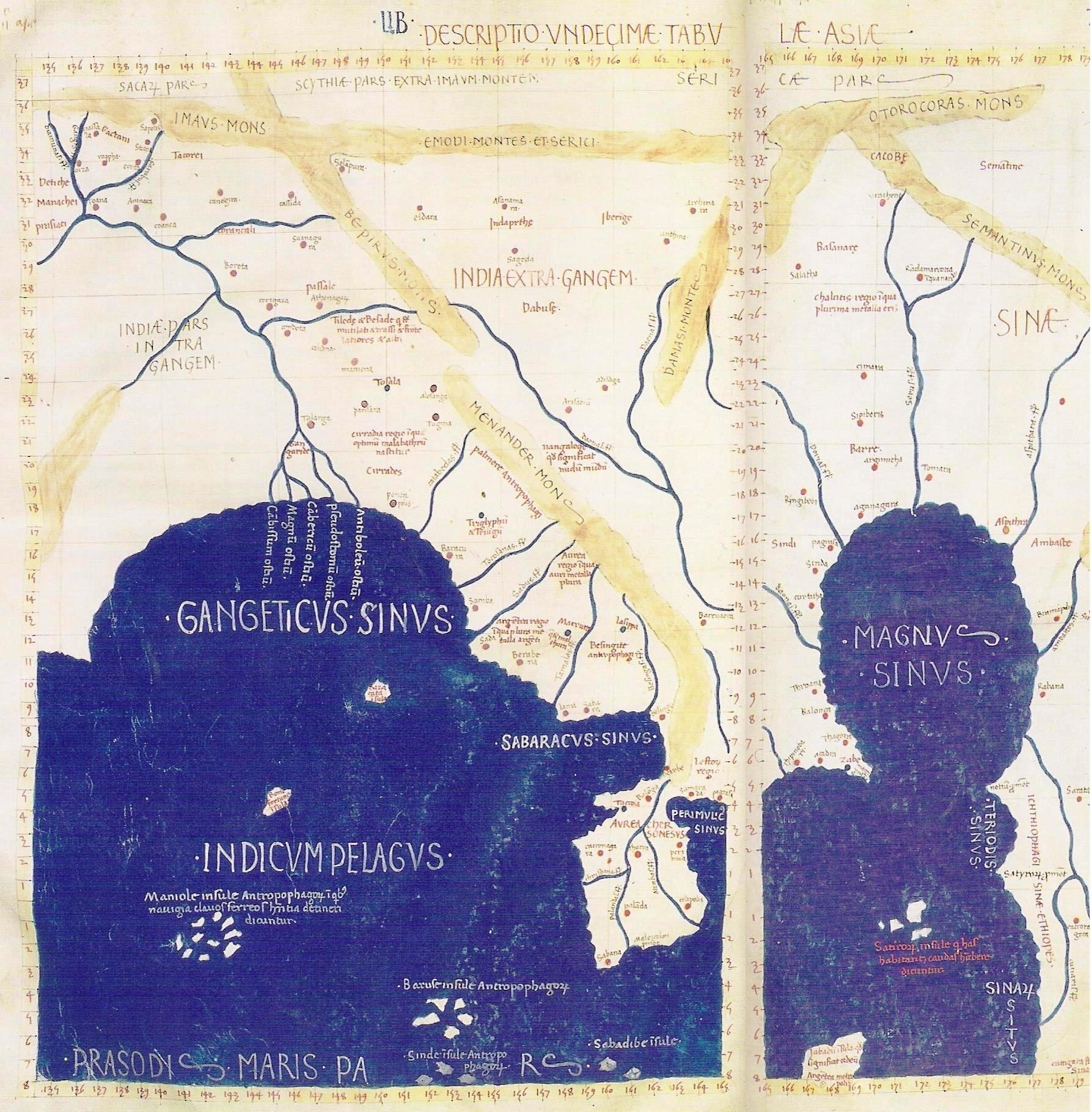
11th Map of Asia
India beyond the Ganges, the Golden Chersonese, the Magnus Sinus, and the Sinae

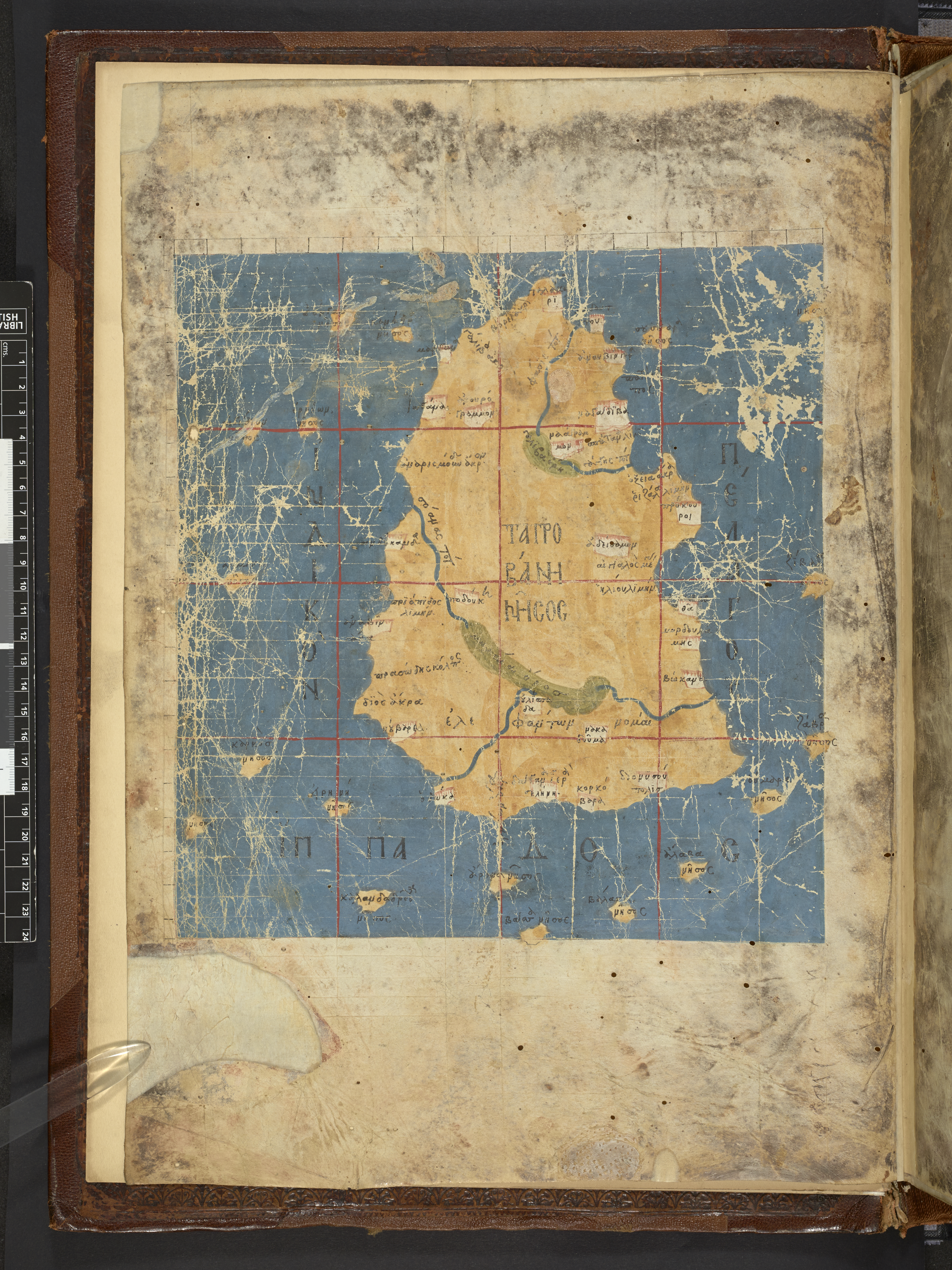
12th Map of Asia
Taprobana

== History ==
=== Antiquity ===
The original treatise by Marinus of Tyre that formed the basis of Ptolemy's Geography has been completely lost. A world map based on Ptolemy was displayed in Augustodunum (Autun, France) in late Roman times. Pappus, writing at Alexandria in the 4th century, produced a commentary on Ptolemy's Geography and used it as the basis of his (now lost) Chorography of the Ecumene. Later imperial writers and mathematicians, however, seem to have restricted themselves to commenting on Ptolemy's text, rather than improving upon it; surviving records actually show decreasing fidelity to real position. Nevertheless, Byzantine scholars continued these geographical traditions throughout the Medieval period.

Whereas previous Greco-Roman geographers such as Strabo and Pliny the Elder demonstrated a reluctance to rely on the contemporary accounts of sailors and merchants who plied distant areas of the Indian Ocean, Marinus and Ptolemy betray a much greater receptiveness to incorporating information received from them. For instance, Grant Parker argues that it would be highly implausible for them to have constructed the Bay of Bengal as precisely as they did without the accounts of sailors. When it comes to the account of the Golden Chersonese (i.e. Malay Peninsula) and the Magnus Sinus (i.e. Gulf of Thailand and South China Sea), Marinus and Ptolemy relied on the testimony of a Greek sailor named Alexandros, who claimed to have visited a far eastern site called "Cattigara" (most likely Oc Eo, Vietnam, the site of unearthed Antonine-era Roman goods and not far from the region of Jiaozhi in northern Vietnam where ancient Chinese sources claim several Roman embassies first landed in the 2nd and 3rd centuries).

=== Medieval Islam ===
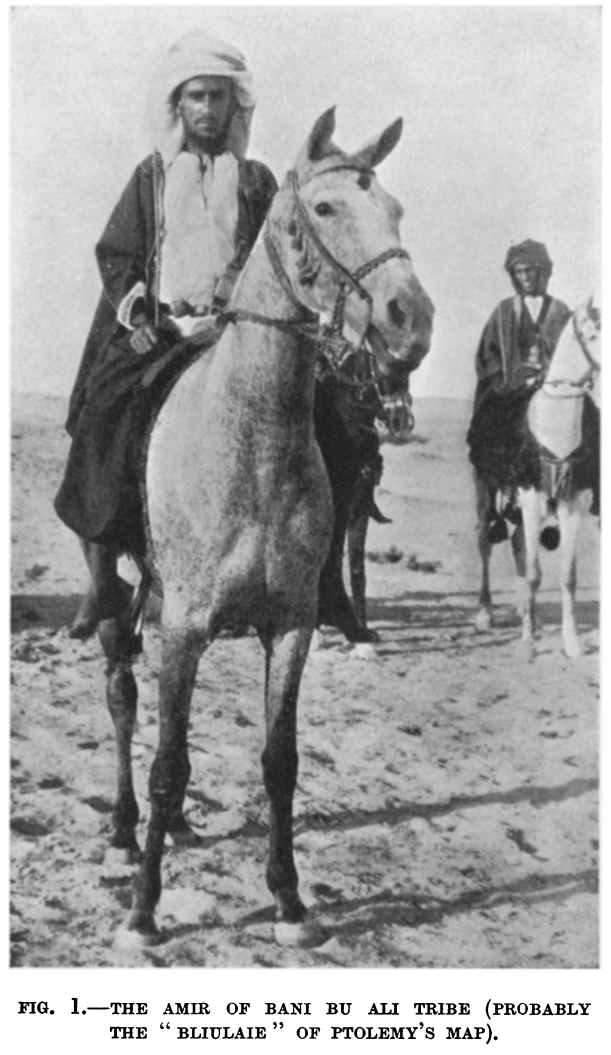
The Amir of Bani Bu Ali tribe, the likely Bliulaie of Ptolemy's map.

Muslim cartographers were using copies of Ptolemy's Almagest and Geography by the 9th century. At that time, in the court of the caliph al-Maʾmūm, al-Khwārizmī compiled his Book of the Depiction of the Earth (Kitab Surat al-Ard) which mimicked the Geography in providing the coordinates for 545 cities and regional maps of the Nile, the Island of the Jewel, the Sea of Darkness, and the Sea of Azov. A 1037 copy of these are the earliest extant maps from Islamic lands. The text clearly states that al-Khwārizmī was working from an earlier map, although this could not have been an exact copy of Ptolemy's work: his Prime Meridian was 10° east of Ptolemy's, he adds some places, and his latitudes differ. C.A. Nallino suggests that the work was not based on Ptolemy but on a derivative world map, presumably in Syriac or Arabic. The coloured map of al-Maʾmūm constructed by a team including al-Khwārizmī was described by the Persian encyclopædist al-Masʿūdī around 956 as superior to the maps of Marinus and Ptolemy, probably indicating that it was built along similar mathematical principles. It included 4530 cities and over 200 mountains.

Despite beginning to compile numerous gazetteers of places and coordinates indebted to Ptolemy, Muslim scholars made almost no direct use of Ptolemy's principles in the maps which have survived. Instead, they followed al-Khwārizmī's modifications and the orthogonal projection advocated by Suhrāb's early 10th-century treatise on the Marvels of the Seven Climes to the End of Habitation. Surviving maps from the medieval period were not done according to mathematical principles. The world map from the 11th-century Book of Curiosities is the earliest surviving map of the Muslim or Christian worlds to include a geographic coordinate system but the copyist seems to have not understood its purpose, starting it from the left using twice the intended scale and then (apparently realizing his mistake) giving up halfway through. Its presence does strongly suggest the existence of earlier, now-lost maps which had been mathematically derived in the manner of Ptolemy, al-Khwārizmi, or Suhrāb. There are surviving reports of such maps.

Ptolemy's Geography was translated from Arabic into Latin at the court of King Roger II of Sicily in the 12th century AD. However, no copy of that translation has survived.

=== Renaissance ===
The Greek text of the Geography reached Florence from Constantinople in about 1400 and was translated into Latin by Jacobus Angelus of Scarperia around 1406. The reception of the Geography in Latin Europe was diverse. In the first half of the 15th century, Florentine humanists used it mainly as a philological resource to understand the geography of ancient texts; Venetian cartographers attempted to reconcile Ptolemaic maps with portolan charts and medieval mappaemundi, and French and German scholars with an interest in astrology focused on Ptolemy's cosmographical concepts. Over the second half of the century, the prestige of the Geography grew to become the necessary framework of any reflection on geographical space.

The first printed edition with maps, published in 1477 in Bologna, was also the first printed book with engraved illustrations. Many editions followed (more often using woodcut in the early days), some following traditional versions of the maps, and others updating them. An edition published at Ulm in 1482 was the first one printed north of the Alps. It became a commercial success and was reprinted in 1486. Also in 1482, Francesco Berlinghieri printed the first edition in vernacular Italian. The edition published in Strasbourg in 1513 was a major step in the modernization of the Geography. It preserved the corpus of Ptolemy's text and maps as faithfully as possible to the original while it provided a separate set of 20 more accurate and up-to-date modern maps. A much improved Latin translation of the Greek original was produced by Willibald Pirckheimer for the 1525 Strasbourg edition, and the first printed edition directly in Greek was authored by Erasmus of Rotterdam in Basel in 1533.

Edition printed in Ulm in 1482

Ptolemy had mapped the whole world from the Fortunatae Insulae (possibly Cape Verde or the Canary Islands) eastward to the eastern shore of the Magnus Sinus. Ptolemy considered this known portion of the world to be comprised within 180 degrees (see below). In his extreme east Ptolemy placed Serica (the Land of Silk), the Sinarum Situs (the Port of the Sinae), and the emporium of Cattigara. On the 1489 map of the world by Henricus Martellus, which was based on Ptolemy's work, Asia terminated in its southeastern point in a cape, the Cape of Cattigara. Cattigara was understood by Ptolemy to be a port on the Sinus Magnus, or Great Gulf, what we now call the Gulf of Thailand, at eight and a half degrees north of the Equator, on the coast of present-day Cambodia, which is where he located it in his Canon of Famous Cities. It was the easternmost port reached by shipping trading from the Graeco-Roman world to the lands of the Far East. In Ptolemy's later and better-known Geography, a scribal error was made and Cattigara was located at eight and a half degrees South of the Equator. On Ptolemaic maps, such as that of Martellus, Catigara was located on the easternmost shore of the Mare Indicum, 180 degrees East of the Cape St Vincent located, due to the scribal error, eight and a half degrees South of the Equator.

Catigara is also shown at this location on Martin Waldseemüller's 1507 world map, which avowedly followed the tradition of Ptolemy. Ptolemy's information was thereby misinterpreted so that the coast of China, which should have been represented as part of the coast of eastern Asia, was falsely made to represent an eastern shore of the Indian Ocean. As a result, Ptolemy implied more land east of the 180th meridian and an ocean beyond. Marco Polo's account of his travels in eastern Asia described lands and seaports on an eastern ocean apparently unknown to Ptolemy. Marco Polo's narrative authorized the extensive additions to the Ptolemaic map shown on the 1492 globe of Martin Behaim. The fact that Ptolemy did not represent an eastern coast of Asia made it admissible for Behaim to extend that continent far to the east. Behaim's globe placed Marco Polo's Mangi and Cathay east of Ptolemy's 180th meridian, and the Great Khan's capital, Cambaluc (Beijing), on the 41st parallel of latitude at approximately 233 degrees East. Behaim allowed 60 degrees beyond Ptolemy's 180 degrees for the mainland of Asia and 30 degrees more to the east coast of Cipangu (Japan). Cipangu and the mainland of Asia were thus placed only 90 and 120 degrees, respectively, west of the Canary Islands.

The Codex Seragliensis was used as the base of a new edition of the work in 2006. This new edition was used to "decode" Ptolemy's coordinates of Books 2 and 3 by an interdisciplinary team of Technische Universität Berlin, presented in publications in 2010 and 2012.

==== Influence on Christopher Columbus ====
Christopher Columbus modified this geography further by using 56 2/3 Italian nautical miles as the length of a degree instead of the longer degree (56 2/3 Arabic miles) of Al-Farghani, and by adopting Marinus of Tyre's longitude of 225 degrees for the east coast of the Magnus Sinus. This resulted in a considerable eastward advancement of the longitudes given by Martin Behaim and other contemporaries of Columbus. By some process Columbus reasoned that the longitudes of eastern Asia and Cipangu respectively were about 270 and 300 degrees east, or 90 and 60 degrees west of the Canary Islands. He said that he had sailed 1100 leagues from the Canaries when he found Cuba in 1492. This was approximately where he thought the coast of eastern Asia would be found. On this basis of calculation he identified Hispaniola with Cipangu, which he had expected to find on the outward voyage at a distance of about 700 leagues from the Canaries. His later voyages resulted in further exploration of Cuba and in the discovery of South and Central America. At first South America, the Mundus Novus (New World) was considered to be a great island of continental proportions; but as a result of his fourth voyage, it was apparently considered to be identical with the great Upper India peninsula (India Superior) represented by Behaim – the Cape of Cattigara. This seems to be the best interpretation of the sketch map made by Alessandro Zorzi on the advice of Bartholomew Columbus (Christopher's brother) around 1506, which bears an inscription saying that according to the ancient geographer Marinus of Tyre and Christopher Columbus the distance from Cape St Vincent on the coast of Portugal to Cattigara on the peninsula of India Superior was 225 degrees, while according to Ptolemy the same distance was 180 degrees.

=== Early modern Ottoman Empire ===
Prior to the 16th century, knowledge of geography in the Ottoman Empire was limited in scope, with almost no access to the works of earlier Islamic scholars that superseded Ptolemy. His Geography would again be translated and updated with commentary into Arabic under Mehmed II, who commissioned works from Byzantine scholar George Amiroutzes in 1465 and the Florentine humanist Francesco Berlinghieri in 1481.

== Longitude errors and Earth size ==
There are two related errors:

- Considering a sample of 80 cities amongst the 6345 listed by Ptolemy, those that are both identifiable and for which we can expect a better distance measurement since they were well known, there is a systematic overestimation of the longitude by a factor 1.428 with a high confidence (coefficient of determination r² = 0.9935). This error produces evident deformations in Ptolemy's world map most apparent for example in the profile of Italy, which is markedly stretched horizontally.
- Ptolemy accepted that the known Oecumene spanned 180° of longitude (Book I, Ch. 11 & 14), but instead of accepting Eratosthenes's estimate for the circumference of the Earth of 252,000 stadia, he shrinks it to 180,000 stadia (Book VII, Ch. 5), with a factor of 1.4 between the two figures. He says there are 500 stadia to a degree of a great circle, according to agreed measurements ("ομολογουμεναις αναμετρησεσι", Book I, Ch. 11).

This suggests either that Ptolemy rescaled his longitude data to fit with a figure of 180,000 stadia for the circumference of the Earth, or that he forced his longitudes to give a 180° difference between the Isles of the Blessed (which he took to be the Canary Islands but about 15° too far south) to the capital (μητροπολις) of the Seres (Xi'an in China). (Ptolemy rescaled experimentally obtained data in many of his works on geography, astrology, music, and optics.) Lucio Russo proposed that the figure of 180°, which Ptolemy inherited from earlier geographers (perhaps Hipparchus), was actually from the Lesser Antilles to Xi'an, implying Pre-Columbian contact with the Caribbean. In that case the 180° would be correct.

== Gallery ==
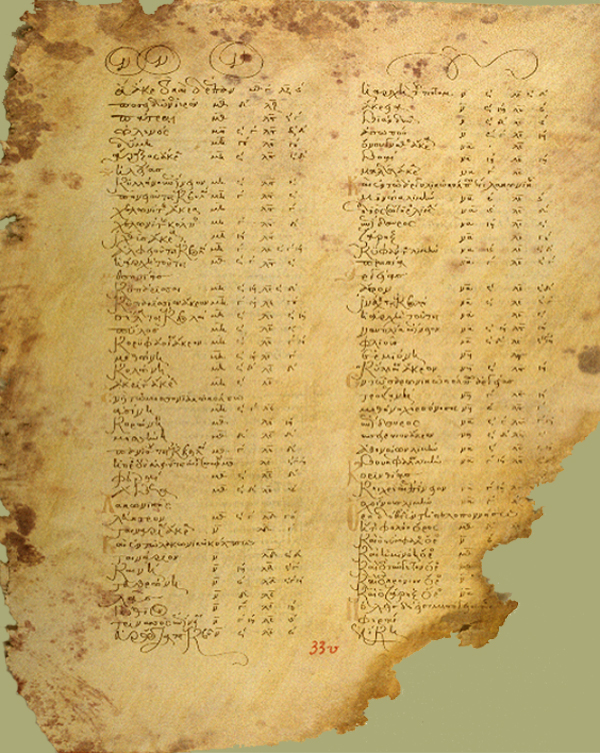
Codex Seragliensis GI 57, fol. 33v

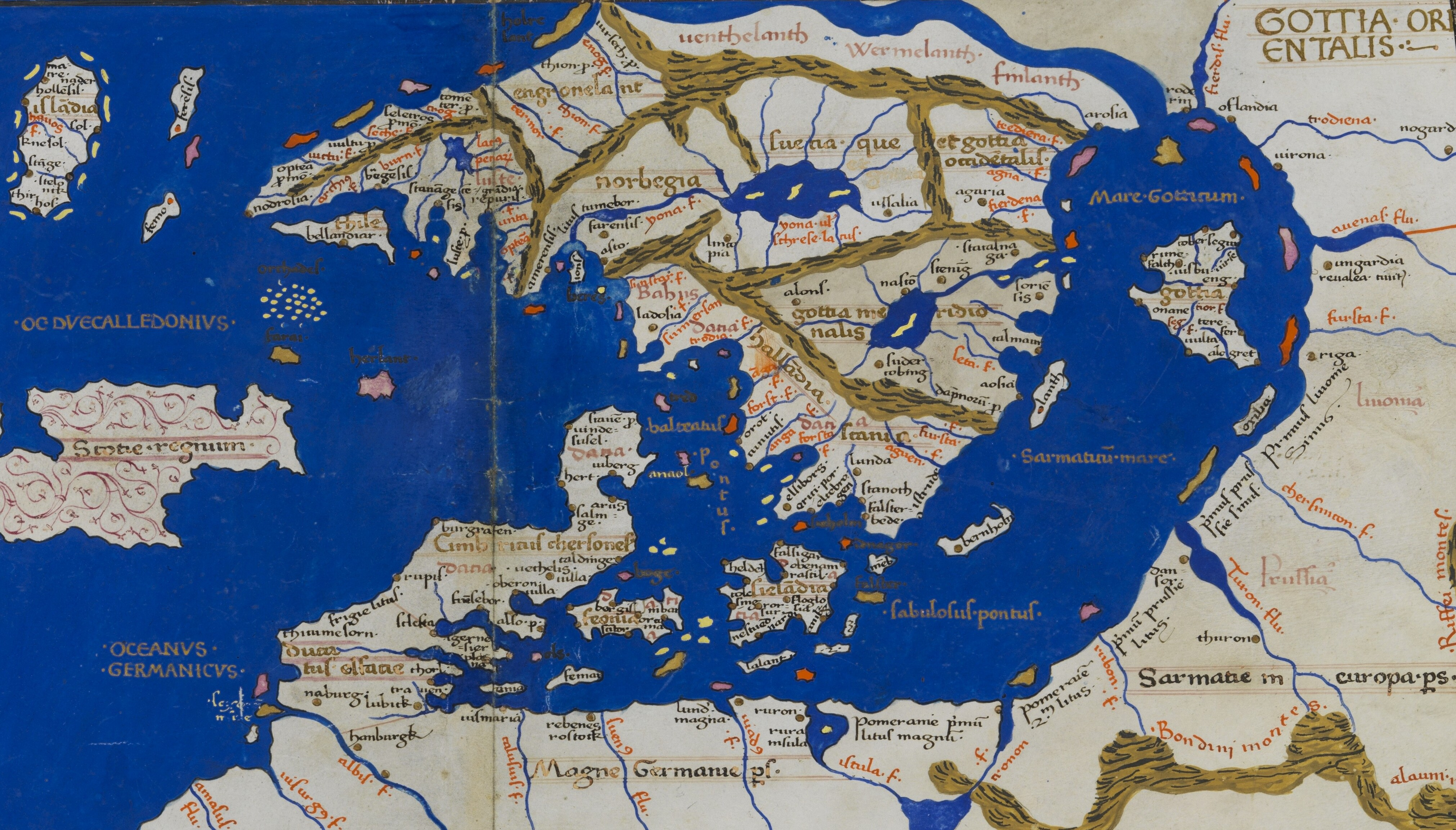
Scandinavia in the Zamoyski Codex (c. 1467)

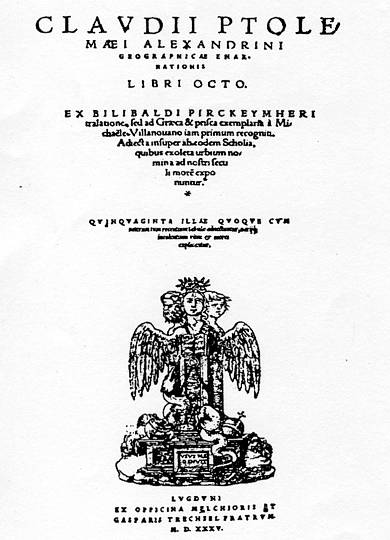
1535 printed edition, title page

19th-century print in Latin (3 volumes)

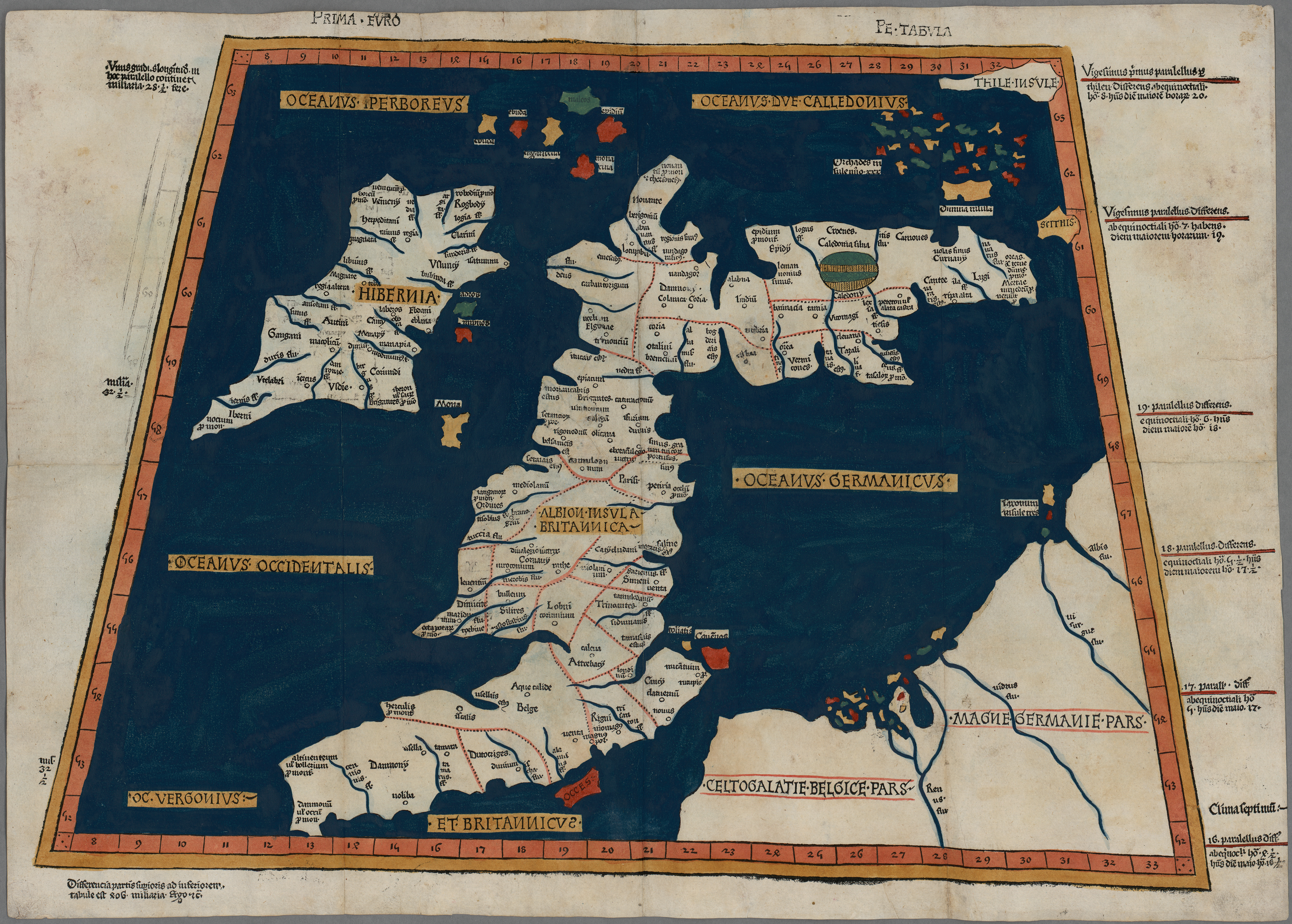
Prima Europe tabula One of the earliest surviving copies of Ptolemy's 2nd-century map of Great Britain and Ireland. 2nd edition, 1482.

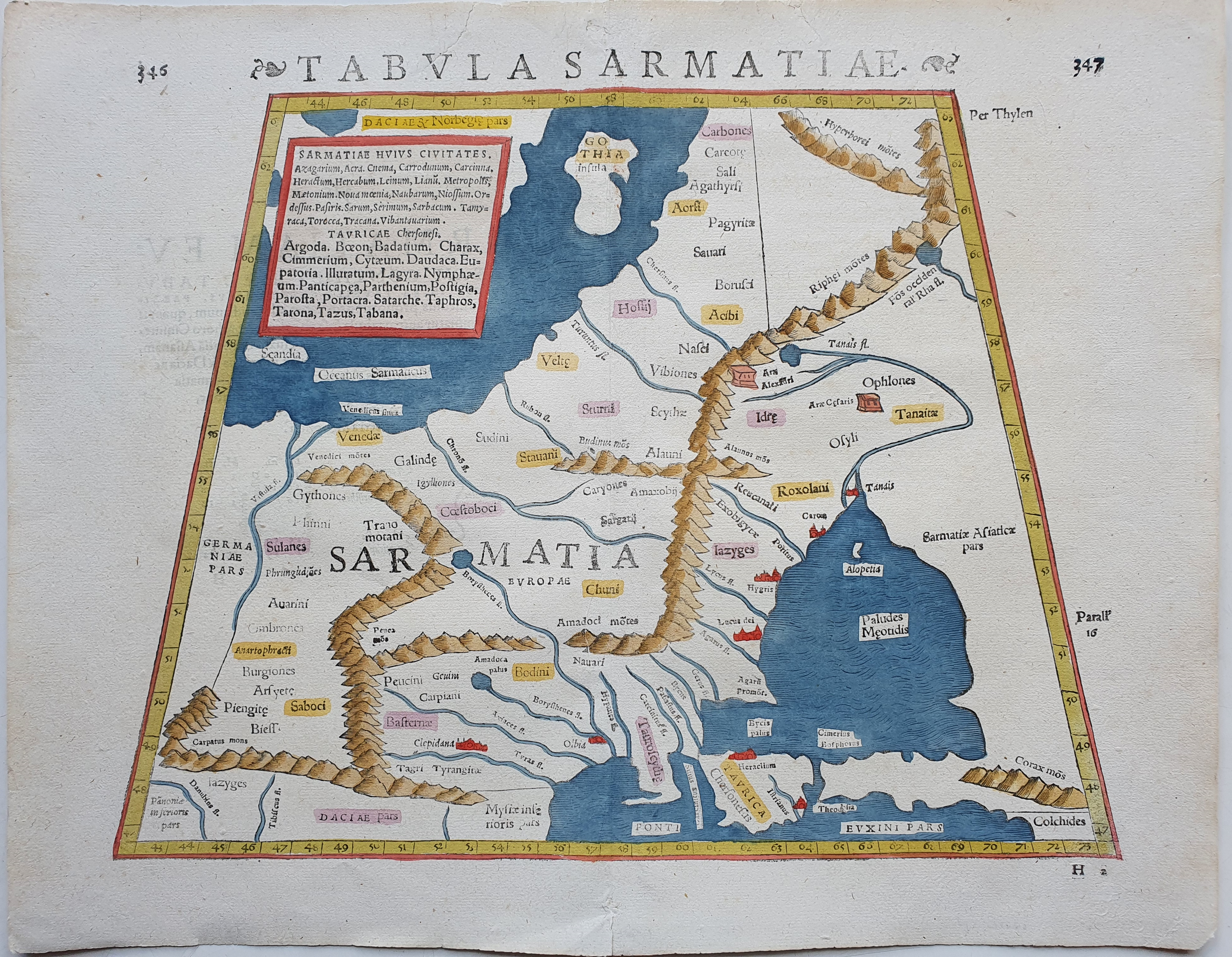
Sebastian Munster, Tabula Sarmatiae, 1571

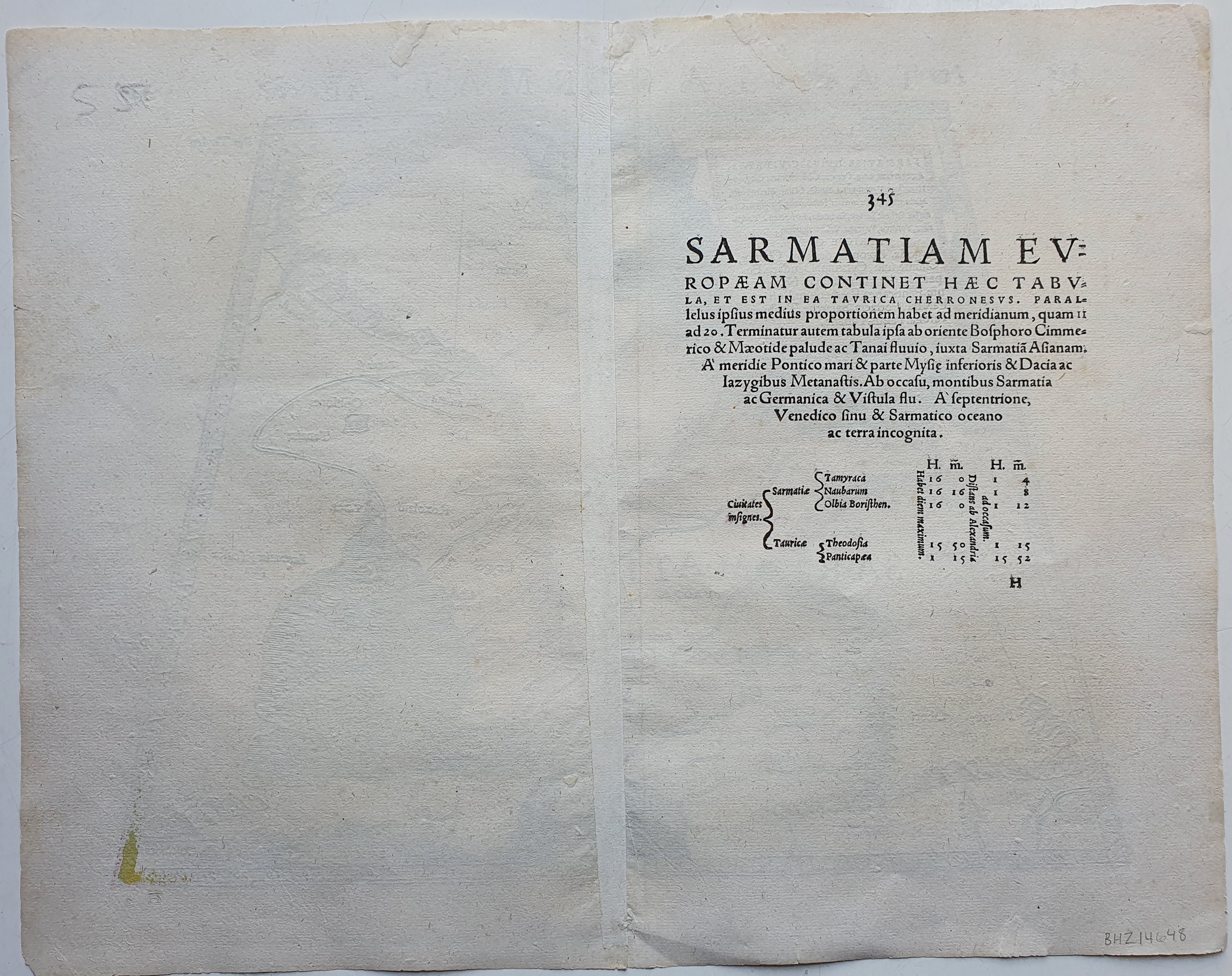
Sebastian Munster, Tabula Sarmatiae, 1571 (reverse)

== See also ==
- Almagest, Ptolemy's astronomical work
- Description of Greece
- Geographia Generalis
- Diodorus Siculus
- Geography and cartography in medieval Islam
- Strabo
- List of most expensive books and manuscripts
- Kitab Surat al-Ard
- Table of Noteworthy Cities
- Chryse and Argyre
