= Handy Tables =

Collection of astronomical tables

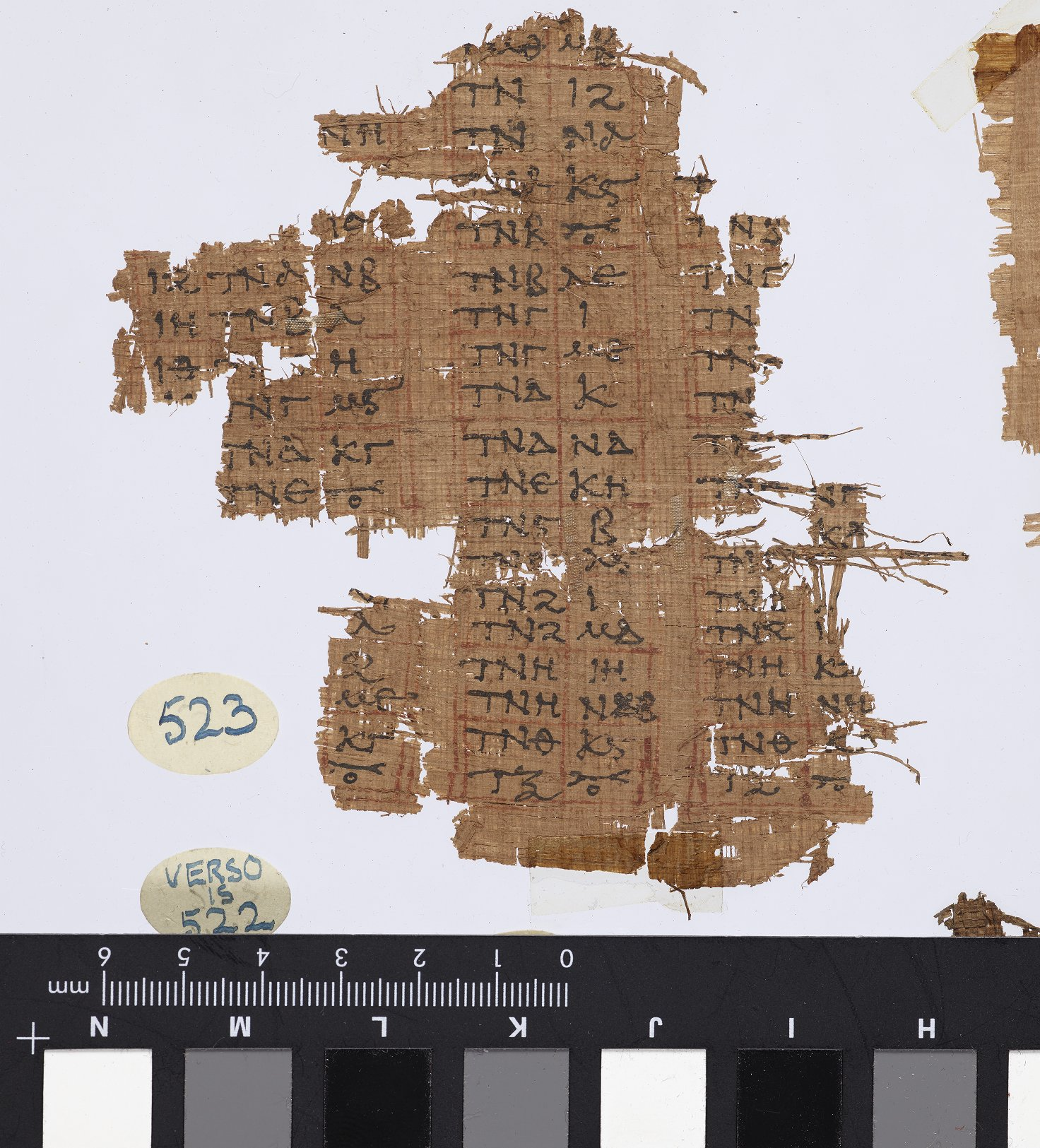
3rd Century AD papyrus fragment of Ptolemy's Handy Tables

Ptolemy's Handy Tables (Ancient Greek: πρόχειροι κανόνες, romanized: Procheiroi kanones) is a collection of astronomical tables that second century astronomer Ptolemy created after finishing the Almagest. The Handy Tables elaborated the astronomical tables of the Almagest and included usage instructions, but left out the theoretical commentary in order to facilitate practical computation. The work is considered of high significance during the late antiquity and in the Middle Eastern and Eastern Mediterranean medieval traditions.

The earliest surviving manuscript in the Rylands Library dates from the 3rd century AD. Ptolemy is also thought to have produced the Table of Noteworthy Cities as an aid for his astronomical tables.

== Papyri ==
A number of fragmentary papyri from 4th century Oxyrhynchus survive:

- P.Oxy. LXI 4167
- P.Oxy. LXI 4168
- P.Oxy. LXI 4169
- P.Oxy. LXI 4170
- P.Oxy. LXI 4171

== Bibliography ==
- Defaux, Olivier (2023). La Table des rois: Contribution à l'histoire textuelle des ›Tables faciles‹ de Ptolémée. Berlin: De Gruyter. doi:10.1515/9783111304458. ISBN 9783111303956.
- Defaux, Olivier (2020). Le Papyrus Rylands 522/523 et les tables de Ptolémée.
