= Muslim expulsion to Lucera =

Forced resettlement of Sicilian Muslims to northern Apulia, 1220 to 1300

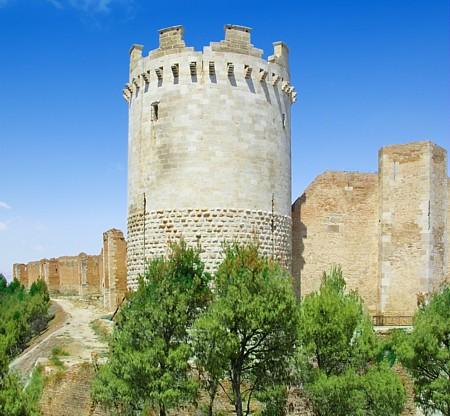
The Hohenstaufen castle of Lucera

The Muslim expulsion to Lucera was the result of the decision of the King of Sicily Frederick II of the Hohenstaufen dynasty (1194–1250) to exile 20,000 Sicilian Muslims to Lucera, a settlement in contemporary Apulia in southern Italy. The settlement thrived for about 75 years. In 1300, it was captured by the Christian forces of Charles II of Naples and its Muslim inhabitants were again exiled.

== Antecedents ==
The Sicilian territories inherited by Frederick II from his mother Constance of Sicily carried with them not only authority over the Roman Catholic majority of the island, but also over significant numbers of Greeks, Jews and Muslims. The Muslims of the regno were a heterogeneous community, that included Arabs (concentrated particularly in the triangle made by Mazara del Vallo-Monreale-Corleone), Berbers (settled mostly in southern-central Sicily), small groups of Persians (amongst them, in particular, the Khwarizmi community of Palermo), a community of Arab, Berber, Persian, as well as other Middle Easterners settled mostly in port towns and nearby villages, most notably in the province of Agrigento and a sizable number of local people who had converted to Islam during the Muslim rule in Sicily.

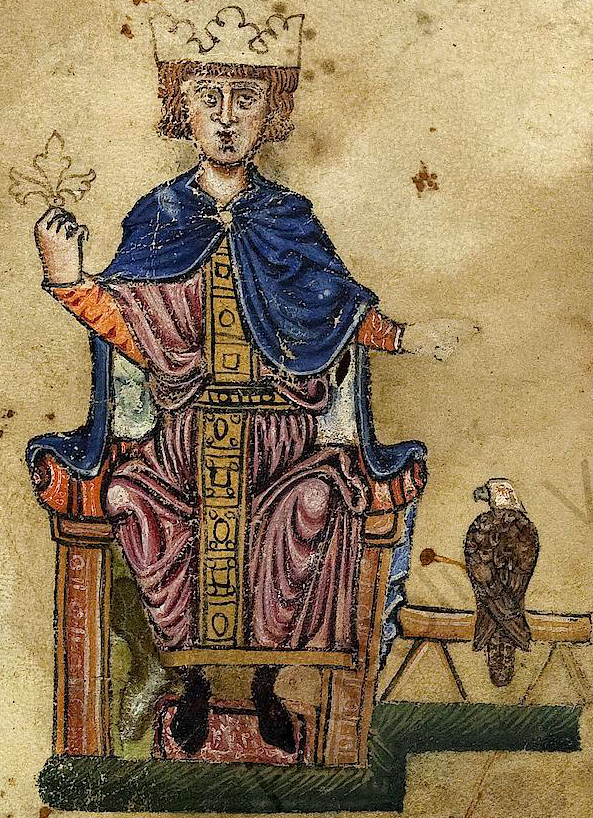
Frederick II and eagle (from De arte venandi cum avibus).

Frederick's accession to the throne did not bring social and religious peace to Sicily. The terrain of the island favoured in fact the resistance action of groups of Muslims, hoping to restore the dominion of Islam in what in Arabic had initially been called al-Ard al-Kabira, the "Great Land", and then, simply, Siqilliyya.

Some Muslim groups had found bases for resistance in central and western Sicily, around Iato and Entella. In Entella the resistance was led by a Muslim woman recorded in the contemporary Christian chronicles as the "Virago of Entella".

As a consequence, after most of the affluent and powerful Muslims had returned to North Africa, in 1220 Frederick II determined to expel the remaining Muslims from Sicily, or at least the less docile groups amongst them, who constituted the essential remaining leadership of the Muslim community, the notables, the scholars and the warriors with their families, and resettle them in the southern Italian mainland.

The localities of Lucera (in Apulia, dating from 1224), Girofalco (now Girifalco, in Calabria) and Acerenza (in Lucania) were chosen for the resettlement. Smaller groups of Sicilian Muslims were also deported to the localities of Stornara, Casal Monte Saraceno and Castel Saraceno as well as to Campania.

The total population of these Muslim communities has been estimated by most modern scholars at around 60,000 individuals, judging from the community's ability to supply the Kings of Sicily a theoretical military contingent of around 14–15,000 men strong, of which 7–10,000, as reported by contemporary sources, were effectively employable on the battlefield at Cortenuova. These troops, most of them lightly armed archers and many also trained in the use of the sling, constituted the faithful personal bodyguard of the Hohenstaufens, since they had no connection to the political rivals of the "House of Swabia" and were ready to wage war—ferociously even for the contemporary standards—on the local populations, and depended entirely on their sovereign.

In 1239 the Emperor Frederick II ordered the concentration of the Saracen communities in Lucera and Apulia, a command that was substantially enforced. By 1240 the resettlements had taken place, with 20,000 Muslims settled in Lucera, 30,000 in other nearby parts of Apulia and the remaining 10,000 who would have been placed in communities outside Apulia.

In this controlled environment, they could not challenge royal authority and still benefited the crown with taxes and military service.

In Lucera (Lucaera Saracenorum or Lugêrah as it was known in Arabic), the de facto political and cultural capital of these Islamic communities and also an important royal residence of the Swabian rulers, 20,000 Sicilian Muslims lived for approximately 80 years, till 1300, when their community was dispersed by order of the new Angevin monarch Charles II of Naples.

== Characteristics of the settlement ==
Expert agriculturists, those Muslims were authorized to work the fields also in Lucera as they had in Sicily. They were authorized to buy and own farmlands and houses, both within the city and in its immediate outskirts. On the whole the taxes due from the Muslims of Lucera were fixed around 10% of their incomes. Other activities they were accepted in were commerce, medicine, in which Arabs were preeminent, and various crafts. As farmers they grew durum wheat, barley, legumes, grapes and other fruits. They also kept bees for honey.

Lucera was, from 1234, the centre for one of the main authorized trade fairs in the Kingdom of Sicily, one of the seven authorized in the regno which took place from June 24 to July 1 each year; the local Muslim merchants were authorized to take part in all of the other fairs in the Kingdom aside from Sicily.

Tensions with the Christian population are evident, as the Christians interceded frequently with Frederick II complaining of favour shown to the Muslims.

An attempt by some of the Muslims of Lucera, in 1239, to return to Sicily was prevented with the use of force from the imperial authorities, who sent back to Lucera as many as those who managed to disembark in the island of their birth. From 1240 the resettlement in continental Italy was considered completed, for in 1239 a chronicle reports, possibly exaggerating, there were no more than 12 Christians in the whole city of Lucera.

The Muslim colony of Lucera was evangelized by the Dominican friars who, under Imperial licence, as requested by the Pope, were authorized to preach and to attempt to convert the "infedeli" (unbelievers), including the Jews, in the city. The results were, usually, decidedly disappointing, in spite of the attempt by the Church in 1215 to carry out highly discriminatory measures, in the Fourth Council of the Lateran, that Muslims and Jews (defined as servi camerae, that is personal property of the Crown) wear clothes that allowed for their easy identification. This measure was, however, accompanied in the Sicilian Kingdom by the Emperor's permission to the Jews of Trani, then particularly numerous, to build a new synagogue. Indicating a nevertheless pertinent split between the sentiments of the Emperor towards his subjects and the sentiments of the Pope.

The Muslim community of Lucera had full freedom to practice its own religion and rites. It had a special type of mosque (jamiʿ) of its own, Koranic schools (Agarenorum gymnasia) and a qadi, able to judge litigation between Muslims, using Islamic law.

The main activity of the males of the Muslim community of Lucera was serving in the royal army; every other activity was secondary, as was also the intention of the Swabian rulers. They were particularly appreciated for their archers, who fought for the Swabians in their Italian campaigns, and for the Angevins of Charles I in Eastern Rome and Albania. As well as the usual pay, in the cases of particularly appreciated behaviour or valour, soldiers might be given individual or family exemption from taxation.

== Downfall ==
In 1266, Manfred had a troop of Luceran archers with him when he was defeated at the Battle of Benevento. The next year Lucera rebelled against the Angevin conquerors. After a hard and exacting siege, Charles of Anjou preserved the Muslim colony, confirming it in all of its existing privileges, in exchange for the payment of a heavy levy. The new French lords then established a Provençal colony of 240 families in control of the fortress of Monte Albano, which dominated the city. According to Andrew of Hungary, Charles ordered the fortifications destroyed, but this does not seem to have taken place.

This moderation was related to the imminent organization of the Eighth Crusade, led by Charles I's brother Louis IX of France, that moved in 1270 against Tunis, and ended in failure with the death of the king from illness.

=== Massacre and mass enslavement ===
With the death of Charles I the situation changed drastically. His son and successor, Charles II, in 1289 had already made plans to expel the Jews from his dominions of Anjou and Maine. In 1300 an identical definitive solution was taken to solve the "problem" of the Muslims of Lucera. Some sources speculate Charles was prompted to seize the settlement as the-then ongoing War of the Sicilian Vespers was going poorly for him, and had sapped his kingdom's finances.

Apparently the expropriations that derived from the measure enabled the Angevin King to settle several of his debts with the Florentine bankers.

The attack, aided by treachery inside Lucera, was led by Giovanni Pipino da Barletta, count of Altamura. A few rich and well connected families of Lucera Muslims opted for a fast, and very opportune, conversion to Christianity.

The majority of the city's Muslim inhabitants were slaughtered or – as happened to almost 10,000 of them – sold into slavery. Their mosques were demolished or the buildings reconverted back to churches, such as the cathedral Santa's Maria della Vittoria formally known as the Lucera Cathedral (Italian: Duomo di Lucera; Basilica cattedrale di Santa Maria Assunta di Lucera). Even most of those Muslims that converted to Christianity were sold as slaves.

Two years later however Charles II agreed that a small group of Saracens originally from Lucera might settle as a community of their own in Civitate but such a community never became of any significance.

=== Legacy ===
After the expulsions of Muslims in Lucera, Charles II tried to settle Christians in the city, amongst them as many Burgundian and Provençal soldiers and farmers as possible. A remnant of the descendants of these Provençal colonists, still speaking a Franco-Provençal dialect, has survived till the present day in the villages of Faeto and Celle di San Vito. A Dalmatian Dominican bishop, Agostino Casotti, was appointed in 1322 in charge of the new diocese of Lucera di Santa Maria, by the Avignon Pope, as requested by the Angevins to restore Christianity in the region.

== See also ==
- Emirate of Sicily
- History of Islam in southern Italy
- Saracens
- Norman-Arab-Byzantine culture

== Bibliography ==
- Michele Amari, Storia dei musulmani di Sicilia, revisione a cura di C. A. Nallino, Catania, Romeo Prampolini, 1933–39
- Umberto Rizzitano, "Gli Arabi in Italia", in: L'Occidente e l'islam nell'Alto Medioevo (Settimane di studio del Centro italiano di studi sull'Alto Medioevo, XII), Spoleto, 1965, pp. 93–114
- Francesco Gabrieli, Umberto Scerrato, et al., Gli Arabi in Italia, Milano, Scheiwiller, 1979 (rist. Garzanti)
- Julie Anne Taylor, "Muslim-Christian Relations in Medieval Southern Italy", in: The Muslim World, 97 (2007), pp. 190–199
- Julie Anne Taylor, Muslims in Medieval Italy: The Colony at Lucera, Oxford, Lexington Books, 2003.
