= E. S. Kennedy =

E. S. Kennedy can refer to:

- Edward Shirley Kennedy, alpinist and writer
- Edward Stewart Kennedy, historian of science
