= Al-Battani =

Muslim astronomer and mathematician (died 929)

al-Battānī
- محمد بن جابر بن سنان البتاني
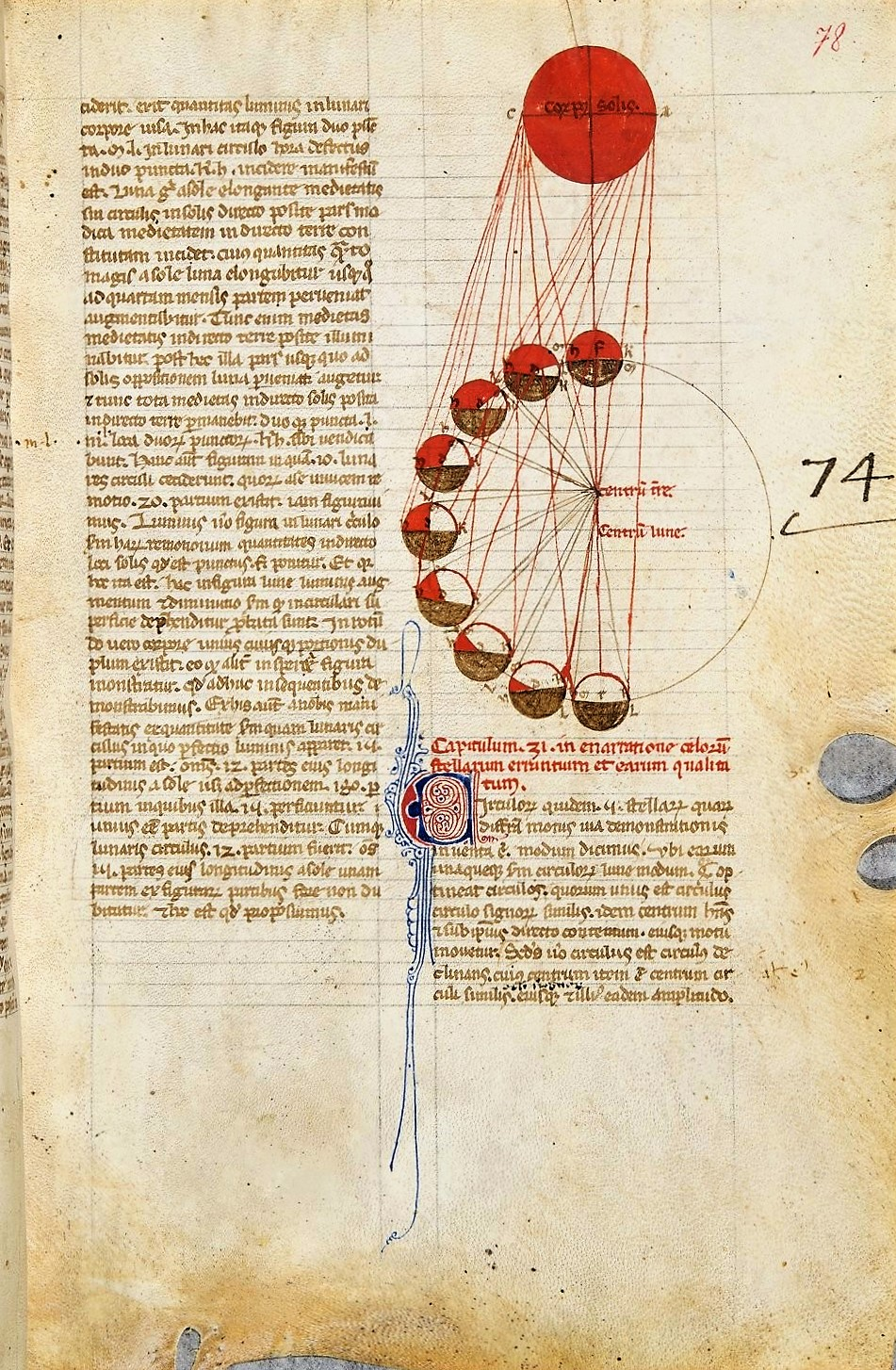
- A folio from a Latin translation of Kitāb az-Zīj aṣ-Ṣābi’ (c. 900), Latin 7266, Bibliothèque nationale de France
- Born: Before 858; Harran, Islamic Syria (modern-day Turkey)
- Died: 929; Qasr al-Jiss, near Samarra

Academic work
- Era: Islamic Golden Age
- Main interests: Mathematics, astronomy, astrology
- Notable works: Kitāb az-Zīj
- Notable ideas: Trigonometrical relationships

Al-Battani (Note: Arabic: البتاني; full name in Arabic: أبو عبد الله محمد بن جابر بن سنان الرقي الحراني السابع البتاني, romanized: Abū ʿAbd Allāh Muḥammad ibn Jābir ibn Sinān al-Raqqī al-Ḥarrānī aṣ-Ṣābiʾ al-Battānī) (before 858 – 929), archaically Latinized as Albategnius, (Note: He was also known in the West as Albategni or Albatenius.) was an Arab Muslim astronomer, astrologer, geographer and mathematician, who lived and worked for most of his life at Raqqa, now in Syria. He is considered to be one of the greatest and most famous of the astronomers of the medieval Islamic world.

Al-Battānī's writings became instrumental in the development of science and astronomy in the west. His Kitāb az-Zīj aṣ-Ṣābi’ (c. 900), is the earliest extant zīj (astronomical table) made in the Ptolemaic tradition that is hardly influenced by Hindu or Sasanian astronomy. Al-Battānī refined and corrected Ptolemy's Almagest, but also included new ideas and astronomical tables of his own. A handwritten Latin version by the Italian astronomer Plato Tiburtinus was produced between 1134 and 1138, through which medieval astronomers became familiar with al-Battānī. In 1537, a Latin translation of the zīj was printed in Nuremberg. An annotated version, also in Latin, published in three separate volumes between 1899 and 1907 by the Italian Orientalist Carlo Alfonso Nallino, provided the foundation of the modern study of medieval Islamic astronomy.

Al-Battānī's observations of the Sun led him to understand the nature of annular solar eclipses. He accurately calculated the Earth's obliquity (the angle between the planes of the equator and the ecliptic), the solar year, and the equinoxes (obtaining a value for the precession of the equinoxes of one degree in 66 years). The accuracy of his data encouraged Nicolaus Copernicus to pursue ideas about the heliocentric nature of the cosmos. Al-Battānī's tables were used by the German mathematician Christopher Clavius in reforming the Julian calendar, and the astronomers Tycho Brahe, Johannes Kepler, Galileo Galilei and Edmund Halley all used Al-Battānī's observations.

Al-Battānī introduced the use of sines and tangents in geometrical calculations, replacing the geometrical methods of the Greeks. Using trigonometry, he created an equation for finding the qibla (the direction which Muslims need to face during their prayers). His equation was widely used until superseded by more accurate methods, introduced a century later by the polymath al-Biruni.

== Life ==
Al-Battānī, whose full name was Abū ʿAbd Allāh Muḥammad ibn Jābir ibn Sinān al-Raqqī al-Ḥarrānī al-Ṣābiʾ al-Battānī, and whose Latinized name was Albategnius, was born before 858 in Harran in Bilād ash-Shām (Islamic Syria), 44 kilometres (27 mi) southeast of the modern Turkish city of Urfa. He was the son of Jabir ibn Sinan al-Harrani, a maker of astronomical instruments. The epithet al-Ṣabi’ suggests that his family belonged to the pagan Sabian sect of Harran, whose religion featured star worship, and who had inherited the Mesopotamian legacy of an interest in mathematics and astronomy. (Note: According to the History of Learned Men by Ibn al-Qifti, writing in the 13th century, al-Battānī's recorded astronomical observations date from 877, and it has been suggested that he was born before 858. Al-Qifti wrote that al-Battani's zīj included observations of the Sun and the Moon that corrected Ptolemy's Almagest, and that al-Battani ceased observing in 918, and died in 929.) His contemporary, the polymath Thābit ibn Qurra, was also an adherent of Sabianism, which died out during the 11th century.

Although his ancestors were likely Sabians, al-Battānī was a Muslim, as shown by his first name. Between 877 and 918/19 he lived in Raqqa, now in north central Syria, which was an ancient Roman settlement beside the Euphrates, near Harran. During this period he also lived in Antioch, where he observed a solar and a lunar eclipse in 901. According to the Arab biographer Ibn al-Nadīm, the financial problems encountered by al-Battānī in old age forced him to move from Raqqa to Baghdad.

Al-Battānī died in 929 at Qasr al-Jiss, near Samarra, after returning from Baghdad where he had resolved an unfair taxation grievance on behalf of a clan from Raqqa.

== Astronomy ==
Al-Battānī is considered to be the greatest and most famous of the known astronomers of the medieval Islamic world. He made more accurate observations of the night sky than any of his contemporaries, and was the first of a generation of new Islamic astronomers that followed the founding of the House of Wisdom in the 8th century. His meticulously described methods allowed others to assess his results, but some of his explanations about the movements of the planets were poorly written, and have mistakes.

Sometimes referred to as the "Ptolemy of the Arabs", al-Battānī's works reveal him to have been a devout believer in Ptolemy's geocentric model of the cosmos. He refined the observations found in Ptolemy's Almagest, and compiled new tables of the Sun and the Moon, previously long accepted as authoritative. Al-Battānī established his own observatory at Raqqa. He recommended that the astronomical instruments there were greater than one metre (3 ft 3 in) in size. Such instruments, being larger—and so having scales capable of measuring smaller values—were capable of greater precision than had previously been achieved. Some of his measurements were more accurate than those taken by the Polish astronomer and mathematician Nicolaus Copernicus during the Renaissance. One reason for this is thought to be that al-Battānī's location for his observations at Raqqa was closer to the Earth's equator, so that the ecliptic and the Sun, being higher in the sky, were less susceptible to atmospheric refraction. The careful construction and alignment of his astronomical instruments enabled him to achieve an accuracy of observations of equinoxes and solstices that had previously been unknown.

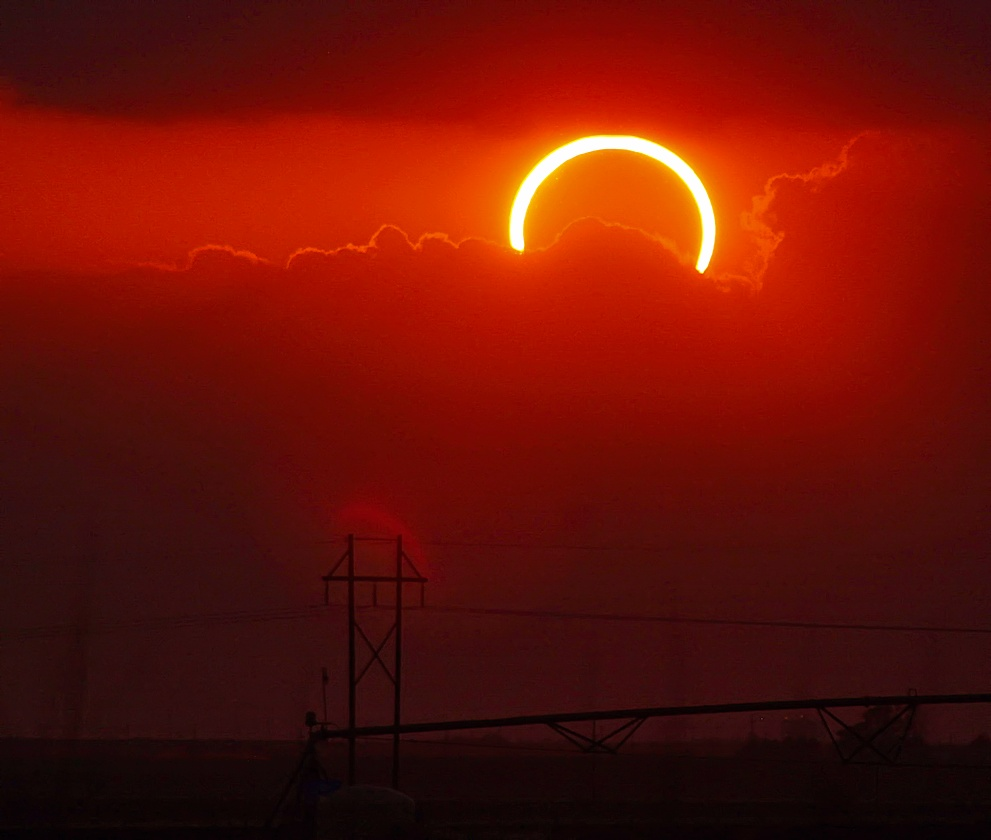
An annular solar eclipse. Al-Battānī was one of the first astronomers to understand why such phenomena can occur.

A representation of the celestial equator and Earth's ecliptic

Al-Battānī was one of the first astronomers to observe that the distance between the Earth and the Sun varies during the year, which led him to understand the reason why annular solar eclipses occur. He saw that the position in the sky at which the angular diameter of the Sun appeared smallest was no longer located where Ptolemy had stated it should be, and that since Ptolemy's time, the longitudinal position of the apogee had increased by 16°47'.

Al-Battānī was an excellent observer. He improved Ptolemy's measurement of the obliquity of the ecliptic (the angle between the planes of the equator and the ecliptic), producing a value of 23° 35'; (Note: A century earlier, other Islamic astronomers had previously found values for the obliquity that came close to the value obtained by al-Battānī, changes in the solar apogee had earlier been detected by Thabit ibn Qurra (or perhaps the Banū Mūsā brothers).) the accepted value is around 23°.44. Al-Battānī obtained the criterion for observation of the lunar crescent—i.e., if the longitude difference between the Moon and the Sun is greater than 13° 66˝ and the Moon's delay after sunset is more than 43.2 minutes, the crescent will be visible. His value for the solar year of 365 days, 5 hours, 46 minutes and 24 seconds, is 2 minutes and 22 seconds from the accepted value.

Al-Battānī observed changes in the direction of the Sun's apogee, as recorded by Ptolemy, and that as a result, the equation of time was subject to a slow cyclical variation. His careful measurements of when the March and September equinoxes took place allowed him to obtain a value for the precession of the equinoxes of 54.5" per year, or 1 degree in 66 years, a phenomenon that he realised was altering the Sun's annual apparent motion through the zodiac constellations.

It was impossible for al-Battānī, who adhered to the ideas of a stationary Earth and geocentricism, to understand the underlying scientific reasons for his observations or the importance of his discoveries.

== Mathematics ==
The fundamental trigonometric functions defined from a right-angled triangle: sine, cosine, and tangent

A spherical triangle with sides a, b, and c

One of al-Battani's greatest contributions was his introduction of the use of sines and tangents in geometrical calculations, especially spherical trigonometric functions, to replace Ptolemy's geometrical methods. Al-Battānī's methods involved some of the most complex mathematics developed up to that time. He was aware of the superiority of trigonometry over geometrical chords, and demonstrated awareness of a relation between the sides and angles of a spherical triangle, now given by the expression:

$$\cos a = \cos b\cos c + \sin b\sin c\cos A$$

Al-Battānī produced a number of trigonometrical relationships:

$$\tan \alpha = \frac{\sin \alpha}{\cos \alpha}$$

$\sec \alpha = \sqrt{1 + \tan^2 \alpha }$, where $\sec \alpha = \frac{1}{\cos \alpha}$.

He also solved the equation

$$\sin x = y\cos x$$,

discovering the formula

$$\sin x = \frac{y}{\sqrt{1 + y^2}}$$

Al-Battānī used the Iranian astronomer Habash al-Hasib al-Marwazi's idea of tangents to develop equations for calculating and compiling tables of both tangents and cotangents. He discovered their reciprocal functions, the secant and cosecant, and produced the first table of cosecants for each degree from 1° to 90°, which he referred to as a "table of shadows", in reference to the shadow produced on a sundial.

A geometrical representation of the method used by al-Battānī to determine the qibla, shown as q from O (the observer) to M (Mecca) (Note: From the diagram, it can be shown that: $$\tan q =\frac{OA}{OD} = \frac{\sin \lambda}{\sin \phi} = \frac{OA/r}{OD/r}$$)

Using these trigonometrical relationships, al-Battānī created an equation for finding the qibla, which Muslims face in each of the five prayers they practice every day. The equation he created did not give accurate directions, as it did not take into account the fact that Earth is a sphere. The relationship he used was precise enough only for a person located in (or close to) Mecca, but was still a widely used method at the time. Al-Battānī's equation for $q$, the angle of the direction of a place towards Mecca is given by:

$\tan q=\frac{\sin\Delta\lambda}{\sin\Delta\phi}$

where $\Delta\lambda$ is the difference between the longitude of the place and Mecca, and $\Delta\phi$ is the difference between the latitude of the place and Mecca.

Al-Battānī's equation was superseded a century after it was first used, when the polymath al-Biruni summarized several other methods to produce results that were more accurate than those that could be obtained using al-Battānī's equation.

A small work on trigonometry, Tajrīd uṣūl tarkīb al-juyūb ("Summary of the principles for establishing sines") is known. Once attributed to the Iranian astronomer Kushyar Gilani by the German orientalist Carl Brockelmann, it is a fragment of al-Battānī's zīj. The manuscript is extant in Istanbul as MS Carullah 1499/3. The authenticity of this work has been questioned, as scholars believe al-Battānī would have not have included al-juyūb for "sines" in the title.

== Works ==
=== Kitāb az-Zīj aṣ-Ṣābi’ ===
Al-Battānī's Kitāb az-Zīj (كتاب الضد or الضد البتاني, "Book of Astronomical Tables"), written in around 900, and also known as the al-Zīj al-Ṣābī (كتاب الزيج الصابئ), is the earliest extant zīj made in the Ptolemaic tradition that is hardly influenced by Hindu or Sasanian–Iranian astronomy. It corrected mistakes made by Ptolemy and described instruments such as horizontal and vertical sundials, the triquetrum, the mural instrument, and a quadrant instrument. Ibn al-Nadim wrote that al-Battānī's zīj existed in two different editions, "the second being better than the first". In the west, the work was sometimes called the Sabean Tables.

The work, consisting of 57 chapters and additional tables, is extant (in the manuscript árabe 908, held in El Escorial), copied in Al-Andalus during the 12th or 13th century. Incomplete copies exist in other western European libraries. Much of the book consists of instructions for using the attached tables. Al-Battānī used an Arabic translation of the Almagest made from Syriac, and used few foreign terms. He copied some data directly from Ptolemy's Handy Tables, but also produced his own. His star table of 880 used around half the stars found in the then 743-year-old Almagest. It was made by increasing Ptolemy's stellar longitudes, to allow for the different positions of the stars, now known to be caused by precession.

Other zījes based on Kitāb az-Zīj aṣ-Ṣābi’ include those written by Kushyar Gilani, Alī ibn Ahmad al-Nasawī, Abū Rashīd Dāneshī, and Ibn al-Kammad.

The first version in Latin from the Arabic was made by the English astronomer Robert of Ketton; this version is now lost. A Latin edition was also produced by the Italian astronomer Plato Tiburtinus between 1134 and 1138. Medieval astronomers became quite familiar with al-Battānī through this translation, renamed De motu stellarum ("On stellar motion"). It was also translated from Arabic into Spanish during the 13th century, under the orders of Alphonso X of Castile; a part of the manuscript is extant.

The zīj appears to have been widely used until the early 12th century. One 11th-century zīj, now lost, was compiled by al-Nasawī. That it was based on al-Battānī can be inferred from the matching values for the longitudes of the solar and planetary apogees. Al-Nasawī had as a young man written astronomical tables using data obtained from al-Battānī's zīj, but then discovered the data he used had been superseded by more accurately made calculations.

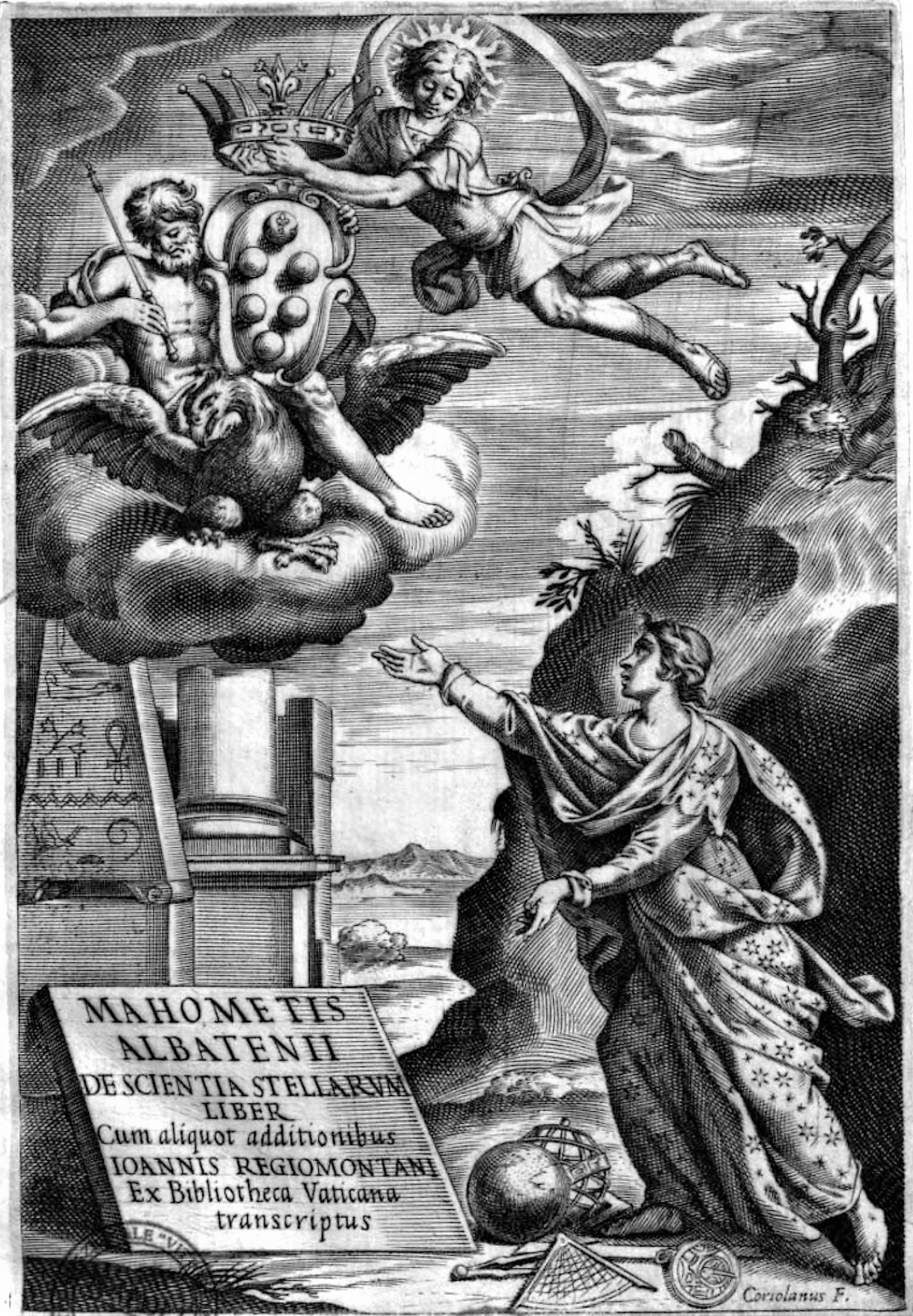
The frontispiece of De scientia stellarum (Bologna, 1645)

The invention of movable type in 1436 made it possible for astronomical works to be circulated more widely, and a Latin translation of the Kitāb az-Zīj aṣ-Ṣābi’ was printed in Nuremberg in 1537 by the astronomer Regiomontanus, which enabled Al-Battānī's observations to become accessible at the start of the scientific revolution in astronomy. The zīj was reprinted in Bologna in 1645; the original document is preserved at the Vatican Library in Rome.

The Latin translations, including the printed edition of 1537, made the zīj influential in the development of European astronomy. A chapter of the Ṣābiʾ Zīj also appeared as a separate work, Kitāb Taḥqīq aqdār al-ittiṣālāt [bi-ḥasab ʿurūḍ al-kawākib] ("On the accurate determination of the quantities of conjunctions [according to the latitudes of the planets]").

Al-Battānī's work was published in three volumes, in 1899, 1903, and 1907, by the Italian Orientalist Carlo Alfonso Nallino, who gave it the title Al-Battānī sive Albatenii opus astronomicum: ad fidem codicis Escurialensis Arabice editum. Nallino's edition, although in Latin, is the foundation of the modern study of medieval Islamic astronomy.

=== Maʻrifat Maṭāliʻi l-Burūj ===
Kitāb maʿrifat maṭāliʿ al-burūd̲j̲ fī mā baina arbāʿ al-falak (معرفة مطالع البروج, “The book of the science of the ascensions of the signs of the zodiac in the spaces between the quadrants of the celestial sphere”) may have been about calculations relating to the zodiac. The work is mentioned in a work by Ibn al-Nadim, and is probably identical with chapter 55 of al-Battānī's zīj. It provided methods of calculation needed in the astrological problem of finding al-tasyīr (directio).

=== Other works ===
- Kitāb fī dalāʾil al-qirānāt wa-l-kushūfāt ("On the astrological indications of conjunctions and eclipses") is a treatise on horoscopes and astrology in connection with conjunctions of Saturn and Jupiter that occurred during the earliest period of Islam. The extant manuscript is held in the İsmail Saib Library at Ankara University.
- Sharḥ kitāb al-arbaʿa li-Baṭlamiyūs (شرح كتاب الأربع مقالات في أحكام علم النجوم, "Commentary on Ptolemy's Tetrabiblos") is a commentary on the Kitāb al-Arbaʿ maqālāt in the version of Abu as-Salt. Al-Battānī mentions two earlier treatises that are likely identical to two chapters of the Ṣābiʾ Zīj. It is extant in the manuscripts Berlin Spr. 1840 (Ahlwardt #5875) and Escorial árabe 969/2.
- Arbaʻ maqālāt (أربع مقالات, "Four discourses") was a commentary on Ptolemy's Quadripartitum de apotelesmatibus e judiciis astrorum, known as the Tetrabiblos. The 10th-century encyclopedist Ibn Nadim in his Kitāb al-Fihrist, lists al-Battānī among a number of authors of commentaries on this work. (Note: Ptolemy's treatise was translated into Arabic by Ibrahim ibn al-Salt and this translation was amended by Hunayn ibn Ishaq.^{cite})
- Maʻrifat maṭāliʻ al-burūj (معرفة مطالع البروج, "Knowledge of the rising-places of the zodiacal signs").
- Kitāb fī miqdār al-ittiṣālāt (كتاب في مقدار الاتصالات), an astrological treatise on the four "quarters of the sphere".

== Legacy ==
=== Medieval period ===
The al-Zīj al-Ṣābī was renowned by medieval Islamic astronomers; the Arab polymath al-Bīrūnī wrote Jalā' al-adhhān fī zīj al-Battānī ("Elucidation of genius in al-Battānī's Zīj"), now lost.

Al-Battānī's work was instrumental in the development of science and astronomy in the west. Once it became known, it was used by medieval European astronomers and during the Renaissance. He influenced Jewish rabbis and philosophers such as Abraham ibn Ezra and Gersonides. The 12th-century scholar Moses Maimonides, the intellectual leader of medieval Judaism, closely followed al-Battānī. Hebrew editions of the al-Zīj al-Ṣābī were produced by the 12th-century Catalan astronomer Abraham bar Hiyya and the 14th-century French mathematician Immanuel Bonfils.

Copernicus referred to "al-Battani the Harranite" when discussing the orbits of Mercury and Venus. He compared to his own value for the sidereal year with those obtained by al-Battānī, Ptolemy and a value he attributed to the 9th-century scholar Thabit ibn Qurra. The accuracy of al-Battānī's observations encouraged Copernicus to pursue his ideas about the heliocentric nature of the cosmos, and in the book that initiated the Copernican Revolution, the De Revolutionibus Orbium Coelestium, al-Battānī is mentioned 23 times.

=== 16th and 17th centuries ===
Al-Battānī's tables were used by the German mathematician Christopher Clavius in reforming the Julian calendar, leading to it being replaced by the Gregorian calendar in 1582. The astronomers Tycho Brahe, Giovanni Battista Riccioli, Johannes Kepler and Galileo Galilei cited Al-Battānī or his observations. His almost exactly correct value obtained for the Sun's eccentricity is better than the values determined by both Copernicus and Brahe.

The lunar crater Albategnius was named in his honour during the 17th century. Like many of the craters on the Moon's near side, it was given its name by Riccioli, whose 1651 nomenclature system has become standardized.

In the 1690s, the English physicist and astronomer Edmund Halley, using Plato Tiburtius's translation of al-Battānī's zīj, discovered that the Moon's speed was possibly increasing. Halley researched the location of Raqqa, where al-Battānī's observatory had been built, using the astronomer's calculations for the solar obliquity, the interval between successive autumnal equinoxes and several solar and lunar eclipses seen from Raqqa and Antioch. From this information, Halley derived the mean motion and position of the Moon for the years 881, 882, 883, 891, and 901. To interpret his results, Halley was dependent upon on knowing the location of Raqqa, which he was able to do once he had corrected the accepted value for the latitude of Aleppo.

=== 18th century – present ===
Al-Battānī's observations of eclipses were used by the English astronomer Richard Dunthorne to determine a value for the increasing speed of the Moon in its orbit, he calculated that the lunar longitude was changing at a rate of 10 arcseconds per century.

Al-Battānī's data is still used by geophysicists.

== Sources ==
- Angelo, Joseph A. (2014). Encyclopedia of Space and Astronomy. New York: Infobase Publishing. ISBN 978-14381-1-018-9.
- de Blois, F.C. (2012). "Ṣābiʾ". In Bearman, P.; Bianquis, T.; Bosworth, C.E.; van Donzel, E.; Heinrichs, W.P. (eds.). Encyclopaedia of Islam (2nd ed.). doi:10.1163/1573-3912_islam_COM_0952.
- Van Brummelen, Glen (2013). "Seeking the Divine on Earth: The Direction of Prayer in Islam". Math Horizons. 21 (1): 15–17. doi:10.4169/mathhorizons.21.1.15. ISSN 1072-4117. JSTOR 10.4169/mathhorizons.21.1.15. S2CID 218543141.
- Cook, Alan H. (1998). Edmond Halley: Charting the Heavens and the Seas. Oxford: Clarendon Press. ISBN 978-0-19-850031-5.
- Van Dalen, Benno (2007). "Wābkanawī: Shams al-Munajjim [Shams al-Dīn] Muḥammad ibn ҁAlī Khwāja al-Wābkanawī [Wābkanawī]". In Hockey, Thomas; et al. (eds.). The Biographical Encyclopedia of Astronomers. Springer. pp. 101–103. doi:10.1007/978-0-387-30400-7_1433. ISBN 978-1-4419-9918-4. (PDF version)
- Dalmau, W. (1997). "Critical Remarks on the use of Medieval Eclipse Records for the Determination of Long-Term Changes in the Earth's Rotation". Surveys in Geophysics. 18 (2/3): 213–223. Bibcode:1997SGeo...18..213D. doi:10.1023/A:1006588010109. ISSN 1573-0956. S2CID 128191632. Archived from the original on 23 October 2012.
- Freely, John (2010). Light from the East: How the Science of Medieval Islam Helped to Shape the Western World. London: I.B.Tauris. ISBN 978-17845-3-138-6.
- Griffin, Rosarii, ed. (2006). Education in the Muslim World: Different Perspectives. Oxford: Symposium Books Ltd. ISBN 978-18739-2-755-7.
- Hoskin, Michael (1999). The Cambridge Concise History of Astronomy. Cambridge: Cambridge University Press. ISBN 978-05215-7-600-0.
- Kennedy, Edward Stewart (1956). "A Survey of Islamic Astronomical Tables". Transactions of the American Philosophical Society. New Series. 46 (2). Philadelphia, Pennsylvania: American Philosophical Society: 10–11, 32–34. doi:10.2307/1005726. hdl:2027/mdp.39076006359272. ISSN 0065-9746. JSTOR 1005726.
- Kennedy, Edward Stewart; et al. (2010). "Al Battani's Astrological History of the Prophet and the Early Caliphate" (PDF). Suhayl. 9. Barcelona: University of Barcelona. ISSN 1576-9372.
- Khallikān (ibn), Aḥmad i. M (1868). Mac Guckin de Slane, William (ed.). Wafayāt al-A'yān wa Anbā' (Ibn Khallian's Biographical Dictionary). Vol. III. Paris & London: W.H. Allen. p. 317.
- Kunitzsch, Paul (1974). Der Almagest: die Syntaxis mathematica des Claudius Ptolemäus in arab. -latein. Überlieferung (in German). Wiesbaden, Germany: Harrassowitz Verlag. ISBN 978-34470-1-517-2.
- McLeod, Alexus (2016). Astronomy in the Ancient World: Early and Modern Views on Celestial Events. Berlin: Springer International Publishing. ISBN 978-33192-3-600-1.
- Moussa, Ali (2011). "Mathematical Methods in Abū al-Wafāʾ's Almagest and the Qibla Determinations". Arabic Sciences and Philosophy. 21 (1). Cambridge: University of Cambridge: 1–56. doi:10.1017/S095742391000007X. ISSN 0957-4239. S2CID 171015175.
- Ibn al-Nadim (1970). Dodge, Bayard (ed.). The Fihrist of al-Nadim; a tenth-century survey of Muslim culture. New York & London: Columbia University Press.
- Nallino, C. A. (1987). "al-Battānī". In Houtsma, M. T.; Arnold, T.W.; Basset, R.; Hartmann, R. (eds.). Encyclopaedia of Islam. Vol. 2 (1st ed.). Brill. doi:10.1163/2214-871X_ei1_SIM_1392. ISBN 9004082654.
- Qifṭī (al-), Jamāl al-Dīn Abū al-Ḥasan ‘Alī ibn Yūsuf (1903). Lippert, Julius (ed.). Ta'rīkh al-Ḥukamā' (in Arabic). Leipzig: Theodor Weicher. p. 280.
- Schlager, Neil; Lauer, Josh, eds. (2001). Science and Its Times: 700–1449. Vol. 2. New York: Gale Group. ISBN 978-0-7876-3934-1.
- North, John (1994). The Norton History of Astronomy and Cosmology. New York: W.W. Norton. ISBN 978-0-393-31193-8.
- Ronan, Colin A. (1983). The Cambridge Illustrated History of the World's Science. New York; Feltham, UK: Cambridge University Press. ISBN 978-05212-5-844-9.
- Singer, Charles Joseph (1997). A Short History of Science to the Nineteenth Century. Mineola, New York: Courier Dover Publications. ISBN 978-0-486-29887-0.
- Whitaker, Ewen A. (1999). Mapping and Naming the Moon: A History of Lunar Cartography and Nomenclature. Cambridge: Cambridge University Press. ISBN 978-05215-4-414-6.
- Wurm, Stefan (2020). The Human Condition: Our Place in the Cosmos and in Life. ATICE LLC. ISBN 978-19518-9-400-9.
- Zamani, Maryann (2014). Battānī, al. Oxford: Oxford University Press. ISBN 978-0-19-981257-8 – via subscription, which may be required, or content may be available in libraries that are in the UK.

=== Versions of Kitāb az-Zīj aṣ-Ṣābi’ ===
==== Kitāb az-Zīj aṣ-Ṣābi’ manuscripts ====
- c. 1245–1250 – Gerard of Abbeville Manuscript: Latin 16657 (Liber Albategni. – Almagesti minoris libri VI. – Tabule stellarum fixarum)
- 1376–1475 – Manuscript:Vat.lat.3098 (De Scientia stellarum (opus astronomicum) – Interpretatio latina Platonis Tiburtini. Praeit interpretis praefatio)
- 14th century – Manuscript Latin 7266 (Opusculum cujus titulus : liber Machometi, filii Gebir, filii Cinem, qui vocatur Albateni, in numeris stellarum et in locis motuum earum, experimenti ratione conceptorum : interprete Platone Tiburtino)

==== 19th, 20th century publications ====
- Battani (al-), Muḥammad ibn Jabir (1899). Nallino, Carlo Alfonso (ed.). Al-Battānī sive Albatenii opus astronomicum: ad fidem codicis Escurialensis Arabice editum (Kitāb Zīj al-Ṣābī') (in Arabic). Vol. 3. Milan: Mediolani Insubrum: Prostat apud Urlichum Hoeplium. ISBN 978-88-88097-26-8.
- Battani (al-), Muḥammad ibn Jabir (1903). Nallino, Carlo Alfonso (ed.). Al-Battānī sive Albatenii opus astronomicum: ad fidem codicis Escurialensis Arabice editum (Kitāb Zīj al-Ṣābī') (in Arabic). Vol. 1. Milan: Mediolani Insubrum: Prostat apud Urlichum Hoeplium. ISBN 978-88-88097-26-8.
- Battani (al-), Muḥammad ibn Jabir (1907). Nallino, Carlo Alfonso (ed.). Al-Battānī sive Albatenii opus astronomicum: ad fidem codicis Escurialensis Arabice editum (Kitāb Zīj al-Ṣābī') (in Arabic). Vol. 2. Milan: Mediolani Insubrum: Prostat apud Urlichum Hoeplium. ISBN 978-88-88097-26-8.
