= Badi, Sudan =

Coordinates: 18°09′20″N 38°26′05″E

Bāḍiʿ was a medieval African port on the Red Sea. It was the first port established by the Arabs in the Bilād al-Sūdān and flourished between about 600 and 1100 AD. It was a merchant settlement conducting trade between its hinterland and Arabia. It does not appear to have fallen under the authority of any established state.

Timothy Insoll locates Bāḍiʿ south of the Gulf of ʿAqīq, just offshore on the island of Er Rih (al-Rīḥ) in what is now Sudan, near the border with Eritrea. The village of ʿAqīq, which gives its name to the gulf, lies some 15 miles (24 km) to the north of the site. Older authorities, such as The Red Sea and Gulf of Aden Pilot, identify the ruins of Er Rih with ancient Ptolemais Theron, but J. W. Crowfoot argues that Ptolemais is ʿAqīq and the ruins of Er Rih medieval Bāḍiʿ. On the other hand, Richard Pankhurst identifies Badi with the Eritrean port of Massawa.

The earliest source to mention the port of Bāḍiʿ is al-Ṭabarī, writing in the ninth century. He states that in 637 the Caliph ʿUmar exiled the poet Abū Miḥjan al-Thaqafī there, indicating that at this early date it was a mere penal colony or place of exile similar to the Dahlak Archipelago. Writing around the same time, Ibn ʿAbd al-Ḥakam mentions Bāḍiʿ as one of the places subject to the treaty made by the governor of Egypt, ʿUbayd Allāh ibn Ḥabḥāb (724–734), with the Beja. ʿAbd Allāh ibn Marwān, the second son of the last Umayyad caliph, Marwān II, passed through the port in 750 while going into exile in Ethiopia (Abyssinia). The port is also mentioned in the writings of al-Yaʿqūbī, al-Hamdānī and Yāqūt al-Rūmī.

Before the rise of ʿAydhāb and Sawākin, Bāḍiʿ was the gateway to the Sūdān for the Arabs. The merchants of Bāḍiʿ traded combs and perfumes from Arabia for elephant tusk and ostrich egg from Ethiopia. They also traded with the Beja. The chief of the Zanāfij Beja was a Muslim who could speak Arabic, and Arab traders from Mecca visited his capital at Baqlīn. These must have passed through the port Bāḍiʿ. Traders from the port even travelled as far inland as the Nile Valley. Gold, probably from the mines of al-Shanka, was exported from Bāḍiʿ.

The reasons for the decline of Bāḍiʿ are not certain. Its trade seems to have been oriented towards the south. It was poorly situated for trade with the Nubian kingdoms of Makuria and Alodia, and Dahlak provided a better entrepôt for trade with Ethiopia. In this way, Bāḍiʿ was squeezed out and its importance remained primary local and tied to its immediate hinterland. The city was apparently in ruins by 1170, when the poet Ibn Qalāqis was shipwrecked off the "island of mosquitoes" (jazīrat al-nāmūs) near Dahlak. He reports in a poem that "the ruins of Badi ... are as though they were inhabited". H. E. Hebbert suggested, based on his analysis of about forty cisterns, that the inhabitants may have had difficulty keeping their water supply free of mosquitoes, which may have hastened the abandonment of the port.

The ruins on Er Rih were surveyed by Crowfoot in 1911. He discovered houses, streets, potsherds, glass, one hundred cisterns and several tombstones with Arabic inscriptions. Song-dynasty export celadon (porcelain), which is known to have reached Sawākin by the twelfth century, has not been found at Bāḍiʿ, which is consistent with the presumed timing of the city's abandonment.
