= Italo Pizzi =

Italian translator and professor

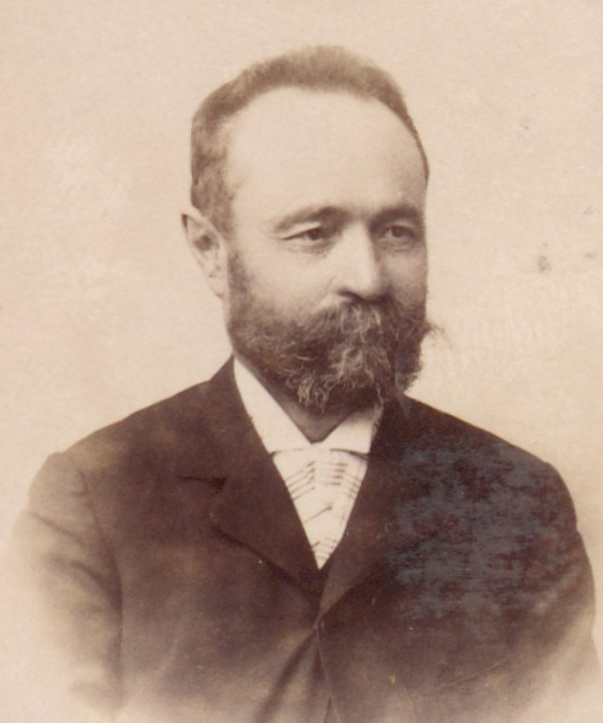
- Born: 30 November 1849; Parma, Kingdom of Italy
- Died: 6 December 1920 (aged 71); Turin, Kingdom of Italy

Academic work
- Discipline: Persian language and literature
- Institutions: University of Turin

Italo Pizzi (Parma, 30 November 1849 – Turin, 6 December 1920) was an Italian academic and scholar of Persian language and literature. He was the first to establish the academic field of Persian language and literature in Italy.

== Biography ==
From a noble family, at age fifteen Pizzi showed a particular interest in studies of oriental languages and in high school he was encouraged by his Latin and Greek teacher, a Sanskritist, to deepen those studies.

For this he went to the University of Pisa, studying among other things Hebrew and other Semitic languages and Sanskrit, as well as Italian literature.

Already in Pisa – working on the Calcutta edition curated by Turner Macan in 1829 – he began to tackle the immense work of the Persian poet Ferdowsi, the Shahnameh, whose bulk of over 100,000 verses makes it longer than the Iliad and the Odyssey put together. An essay of his was published on Rostam and the Akvān Div, thanks to the active interest of Angelo De Gubernatis.

After graduating in 1871, he began working as a teacher of literature in his native city, without ever abandoning his interest in Orientalism and, more specifically, Iranian languages.

He moved to Florence in 1879, and in 1880 he became deputy librarian of the Laurentian Library, earning a lectureship in Iranian studies at the Royal Institute of Higher Studies.

On 11 May 1885 he obtained a teaching position at the University of Turin, moving to the Piedmontese capital with his wife, who would bring their only son, Carlo, into the world the following year. In 1887 he became an extraordinary professor of Persian and Sanskrit. Among his pupils at the University of Turin was the young Carlo Alfonso Nallino.

During this period, from 1886 to 1888, he published the first (and still the only complete) Italian translation of Ferdowsi's Shahnameh in 8 volumes. He also translated several other Persian poets into Italian.

He was appointed Director of the Oriental Institute of Naples (the former name of the University of Naples "L'Orientale"), but remained in Naples for a short time, returning to Turin. Finally, he attained the role of full professor on 21 December 1899.

== Works ==
- Storia di Sohrab. Episodio del Shahnameh di Firdusi recato dal persiano in versi italiani. Con altre brevi traduzioni, Parma, Fiaccadori, 1872.
- Racconti epici del Libro dei re di Firdusi recati per la prima volta dal persiano in versi italiani con un discorso d’introduzione sull’epopea persiana, Turin, Ermanno Loescher, 1877.
- La morte di Rustem. Episodio del Libro dei re di Firdusi recato in versi italiani, Florence, Tip. del Vocabolario, 1882 (extracted from Il Fanfani, I (1881), pp. 267–270, 277–280, 300–303, 330–334, 348–351, 363–367).
- Avventure di un principe di Persia. Episodio tratto dal Libro dei re di Firdusi recato dal persiano in versi italiani, Florence, Successori Le Monnier, 1882.
- Manuale della lingua persiana. Grammatica, antologia e vocabolario, Leipzig, W. Gerhard, 1883.
- Firdusi, Il libro dei re. Poema epico recato dal persiano in versi italiani, 8 vol., Turin, Vincenzo Bona, 1886–88 (then a revised and summarized edition, 2 vol., Turin, UTET, 1915).
- Letteratura persiana, Milan, Hoepli, 1887.
- I Nibelunghi. Poema epico germanico, Translation in Italian verse, 2 vol., Milan, Ulrico Hoepli, 1889.
- Letteratura persiana, 2 vols., Turin, 1894.
- Chrestomathie persane avec un abrégé de la grammaire et un dictionnaire, Turin, Vincenzo Bona, 1889.
- Storia della poesia persiana, 2 vols., Turin, 1894.
- Grammatica elementare della lingua sanscrita, con temi, antologia e vocabolario, Turin, Clausen, 1896.
- Grammatica elementare dell’antico iranico (zendo e persiano antico) con antologia e vocabolario, Turin, Clausen, 1897.
- Miro e Naida: romanzo orientale, Turin, 1901.
- Elementa grammaticae hebraicae, cum chrestomathia et glossario, Augusta Taurinorum, Tipografia Salesiana, 1899 (2nd edition 1904; 3rd edition 1909).
- Letteratura araba, Milan, Hoepli, 1903.
- Islamismo, Milan, Hoepli, 1903.
- Il Roseto di Saadi, 2 vol., Lanciano, Carabba, 1917.

== See also ==
- Shahnameh
- Ferdowsi
- Iranian studies

== Bibliography ==
- F. Gabrieli, Arabeschi e studi islamici, Napoli, Guida, 1973, p. 247.
