= Umberto Rizzitano =

Italian academic

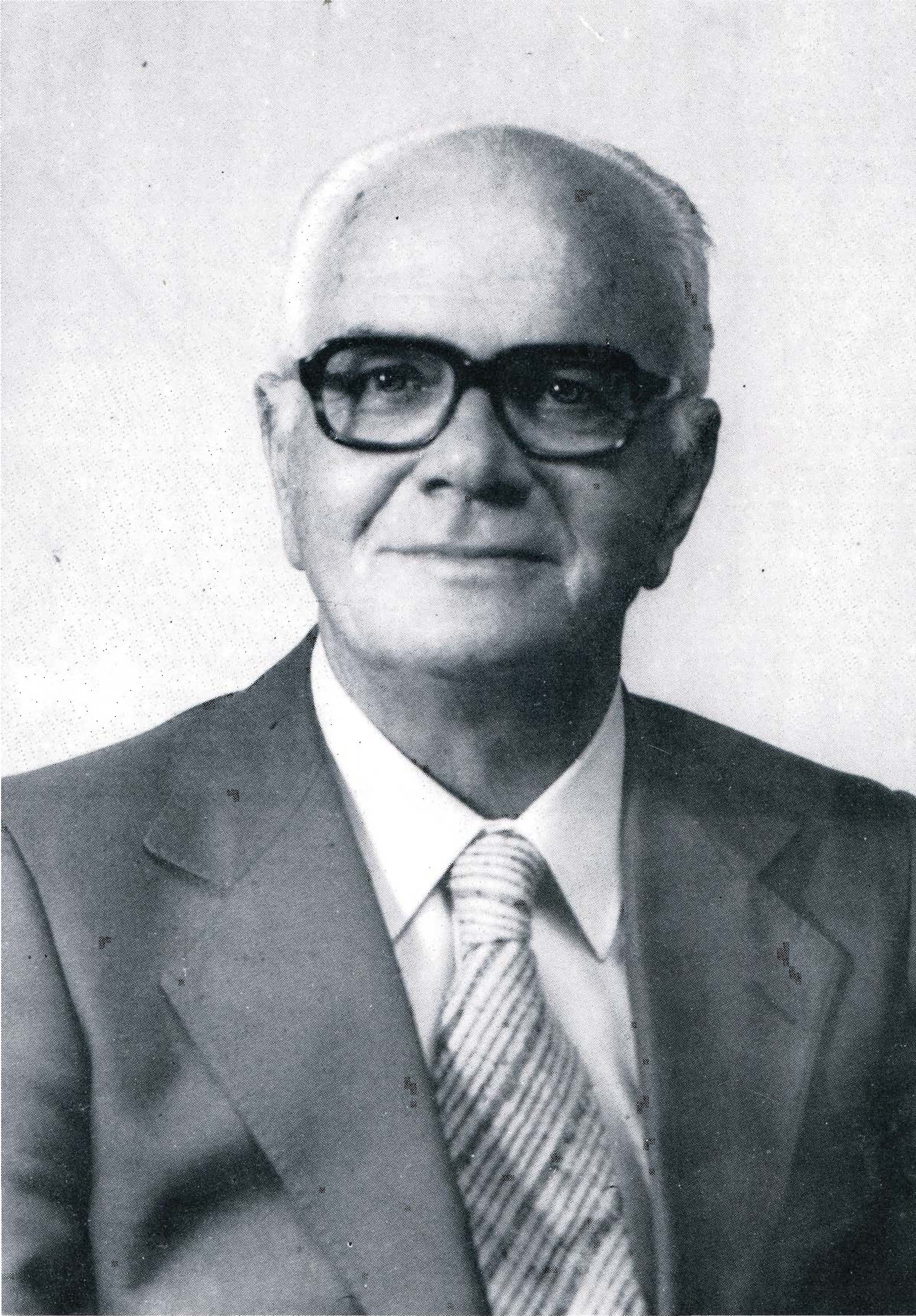
- Italian Arabist and academic
- Born: 18 October 1913; Alexandria, Egypt
- Died: 6 February 1980 (aged 66); Palermo, Sicily

Umberto Rizzitano was an Italian academic, known for reviving Arab-Islamic studies in the University of Palermo and Sicily, neglected since the death of Michele Amari.

== Life ==
Rizzitano was born in Egypt, where his family (of Sicilian origin, from Messina) had moved for his father's work. Here he studied in Italian schools, perfecting his classical Arabic, written and spoken, as well as the Egyptian language.

He graduated in 1937 from the University of Rome, where Prof. Michelangelo Guidi, acted as advisor on a thesis on the Umayyad poet, Abū Miḥǧan Nuṣayb b. Rabāḥ (أبو محجن نصيب بن رباح), on which he gave a report to the XX International Congress of Orientalists (Brussels, 5–10 September 1938). Rizzitano participated in WWII. When he almost immediately fell prisoner in 1940, to the Egyptian Sidi Barrani, he managed to escape and reach Cairo clandestinely before regaining Italy.

Rizzitano was Libera docenza and assistant to the chair of Arabic language and literature at the University of Rome, where he had conducted his studies, however, he returned to Egypt as director of Italian at the University of Cairo and at the University of 'Ayn Shams, of the same Egyptian capital. In Cairo he directed the Institute of Italian Culture with untiring enthusiasm.

In 1959 the chair in Palermo of Arabic language and literature was finally filled after decades of vacancy. Rizzitano was the undisputed winner. At the same time, his statement on the "Return of the teaching of the Arabic language and literature to the University of Palermo" outlined a budget and an operational project aimed at encouraging participation by the younger generation. Through tireless research, Rizzitano shaped this project assuming the role of bridge between Italian and Arab cultures.

In 1949 he participated in the first translation into Italian, for Einaudi, of the complete Arabic version of One Thousand and One Nights, – together with his fraternal friend Francesco Gabrieli, Antonio Cesaro, Virginia Vacca and Costantino Pansera and in that same 1944, he translated the novel Zaynab by Mohammed Hussein Heikal.
In 1965 he published for the Institute for the Orient the masterpiece of Ṭāhā Ḥuseyn, al-Ayyām (‘The Days’) and between 1975 and 1977 he participated in the first world edition of the manuscript of the geographical work of al-Idrisi sponsored by the Università degli Studi di Napoli "L'Orientale" of Naples and by the Istituto italiano per il Medio ed Estremo Oriente of Rome and updated the Biblioteca arabo-sicula by Michele Amari, in view of the National Edition of the works of the great Sicilian scholar.

Rizzitano's attention to the issue of dialogue between religions and cultures led him, at the express invitation of the Arab Republic of Libya, to participate, as an Italian observer, in the Islamic-Christian colloquium held in Tripoli from 1 to 5 February 1975. He organized a famous international conference, held in Rome, Venice and Palermo, on the "Arab presence in European culture". In 1979 he became President of the Istituto per l'Oriente Carlo Alfonso Nallino, the oldest Italian non-university research center for modern and contemporary Arabists. His contributions on the emerging Egyptian literature of the twentieth century are fundamental, without forgetting the Arab-Sicilian literati, such as Abū l-Ḥasan ʿAlī b. ʿAbd al-Raḥmān al-Ṣiqillī, called "al-Ballanūbī" (or Billanūbī, that is "of Villanova").

The bibliography of Umberto Rizzitano's writings records over 120 publications among those that have particularly distinguished his work as an Arabist and Islamist. and confirms the fact that the continuous search for common historical, linguistic and literary roots had as its engine the demonstration of "a possibility of coexistence of men of different race and religion".

He participated in numerous national and international conferences, where he always managed to fascinate the Arabic-speaking audience with his perfect pronunciation of the Arabic language and published numerous scientific contributions that still make him the most fruitful Sicilian scholar of Arabism after Amari, of whom he was the most worthy disciple.

== Selected works ==
(Just some of the most significant of the 121 printed works by Rizzitano are listed)

- Mohammed Hussein Heikal, Zeinab, translation by U. Rizzitano, edited by the Oriental Institute – Rome, series "Narratori Orientali" directed by A. Giamil V.M., Editorial I.T.L.O., Rome 1944.
- "ʿAbd al-ʿAzīz b. Marwān governor of Umayyid Egypt", in Accounts of the Accademia dei Lincei, ser. VIII, II, 1947, pp. 321–347.
- (with Francesco Giunta), Terra senza crociati , Palermo, Flaccovio, 1967. ISBN 88-7804-058-4
- Arabic literature , in History of Eastern Literatures , vol. II, directed by Oscar Botto, A. Vallardi Editore, 1969
- History of the Arabs from pre-Islamic times to today , Palermo, U. Manfredi, 1971, 345 pp.
- Muhammad prophet and statesman , Palermo, 1974, 182 pp. (translated into French, German and Spanish).
- The Arabs in Italy , on The West and Islam in the Early Middle Ages (Study weeks of the Centro italiano di studi sull'alto medioevo), Spoleto, 1965, pp . 93–114.
- Storia e cultura nella Sicilia saracena, Palermo, 1975, 459 pp.
- I giorni . Introduction and translation of the "al-Ayyām" of Ṭāhā Ḥuseyn, Rome, Istituto per l'Oriente Carlo Alfonso Nallino, 1966.
- Opus geographicum, sive Fasciculus nonus: "Liber ad eorum delectationem qui terras peragrare studeant / Al-Idrīsī (Abū ʿAbd Allāh Muḥammad ibn Muḥammad ʿAbd Allāh ibn Idrīs al-Ḥammūdī al-Ḥasanī); consilio et auctoritate E. Cerulli, F. Gabrieli, G. Levi Della Vida [et al.]; una cum aliis ediderunt A. Bombaci, U. Rizzitano, R. Rubinacci [et al.]; [Index geographicus, index historicus, index rerum par M. T. Petti Suma] / Lugduni Batavorum (Leyde), E.J. Brill, 1984.

== Bibliography ==
- Francesco Gabrieli, Ricordo di Umberto Rizzitano (1913–1980) , Istituto di Studi Orientali dell'Università di Palermo, 1980, 33pp.
- -, "Umberto Rizzitano (1913–1980)", in: Orientalisti del Novecento, Rome, Istituto per l'Oriente C. A. Nallino, 1993, pp. 149–160.
- Adalgisa De Simone, " Nella Sicilia Araba tra storia e filologia", 1999, Palermo, p. 106.
