= Ibn Qalaqis =

12th-century Egyptian Arab poet and author

Abu al-Futuh Nasr al-Lakhmi أبو الفتوح نصر اللخمي
- Born: November 26, 1137; Alexandria, Egypt
- Died: July 1, 1172 (aged 34); Aydhab
- Occupation: Poet
- Writing career
- Language: Arabic
- Period: Abbasid era
- Genre: Traditional Arabic literature
- Literary movement: Literature in the second Abbasid era (fragmentation of the caliphate)

Abu ʾl-Fatḥ (Note: Sometimes Futūḥ.) Naṣr Allāh ibn ʿAbd Allāh (Arabic: ابن قلاقس الإسكندري; 1137–1172), known as Ibn Qalāqis (or Ḳalāḳis) and also al-Qāḍī al-aʿazz ("he most honorable judge"), was an Egyptian Arab poet and author. He spent his last few years travelling widely through Sicily and Yemen. The collections of poems and letters he left behind contain much valuable information for historians.

== Life ==
Places Ibn Qalaqis visited while in Sicily

Ibn Qalaqis was born in 532 AH (1137 AD) in Alexandria, then part of the Fatimid Caliphate. He moved to Cairo for his education, and studied under Abu Tahir al-Silafi. In 1165/6, he wrote to the Sicilian qāʾid Abu'l-Qasim ibn Hammud ibn al-Hajar, requesting financial assistance for his ḥajj (pilgrimage) to Mecca. He met with difficulties in Egypt and never went, instead accepting Abu'l-Qasim's invitation to come to the island of Sicily, then part of the Norman Kingdom, but retaining a vibrant Arab culture. He arrived in Messina on 11 May 1168 and stayed on the island at least until April 1169.

In Sicily, he stayed in Palermo at the house of his patron Abu'l-Qasim. He arrived in Palermo on 9 June 1168 at the start of Ramadan, and passed the following months visiting the gardens of the Conca d'Oro and the royal palaces. He dedicated qaṣīdas to Abu'l-Qasim and his three sons, Abu Bakr, Umar and Uthman.

In the summer of 1168, he had a falling out with Abu'l-Qasim—perhaps over his friendship with al-Sadid Abu'l-Maqarim Hibat Allah ibn al-Husri. (Note: Hugo Falcandus describes the feud between Abu'l-Qasim, "the most noble and powerful of the Sicilian Muslims", and al-Sadid, "the richest of the Muslims", whose friendship with Ibn Qalaqis might date as far back as 1161.) While he was preparing to return to Egypt, he received a gift of cheese, butter, oil, tuna, cotton, walnuts, almonds, hazelnuts, wheat, flour, wine, and other things. Although he does not say from whom the gift came, it was probably from the royal court. Shortly thereafter, he was given an audience with King William I and Queen Margaret. He wrote qaṣīdas to the monarchs and to Richard the Vizier, a former Muslim who probably arranged the audience.

From Palermo, he went to Termini, Cefalù, Caronia, Patti, Oliveri, (Note: Michele Amari thought that the place indicated by the Arabic was Lipari.) and Milazzo before stopping in Syracuse in order to take ship to Egypt. There, however, he wrote a qaṣīda to Abu'l-Qasim, who then accepted him back. He returned to Palermo via Lentini, Caltavuturo and Termini. He was back in Palermo by 2 January 1169, when he wrote a qaṣīda on the birth of a son to Abu'l-Qasim's brother. He wrote a farewell qaṣīda in April 1169 and left Sicily not long after.

In late 1169 or early 1170, he travelled to Yemen, then ruled by the Zurayids, who recognized Fatimid authority. He went by way of the Egyptian port of Aydhab. He suffered a shipwreck shortly after leaving Sicily. The purpose of his visit may have been commercial or diplomatic, since he had been urged by the Fatimid poet Umara al-Yamani to see the vizier of Aden, Abu Bakr al-Idi. In Yemen, besides Aden, he also visited Zabid.

On his return trip to Aydhab, he suffered another shipwreck, this time in the Dahlak Islands. He was forced to seek the hospitality of the Sultan of Dahlak. During his sojourn in Dahlak, he saw the ruins of the old port of Badi, which he describes in a poem. He eventually got as far as Aydhab, where he died in 567 AH (1172 AD).

== Writings ==
Ibn Qalaqis's poetry was collected in a dīwān (collection of short poems), which has been edited and published. His poems praise many important rulers and officials of Egypt, Sicily and Yemen. He praises the last Fatimid caliphs and their viziers, such as Ibn Masal and Shawar.

A collection of Ibn Qalaqis's letters in the form of an epistolary novel, the Tarassul, also survives. He wrote to friends, patrons and Fatimid officials in both Egypt and Yemen.

He also wrote a book, al-Zahr al-bāsim fī awṣāf Abī'l-Qāsim, (Note: Also given as al-Zahr al-bāsim wa-l-ʿarf al-nāsim fī madīḥ al-ajall Abī'l-Qāsim, "Smiling Flowers and Redolent Perfume in Praise of the Sublime Abu'l-Qasim".) in honour of Abu'l-Qasim. It is quoted in both prose and verse in the Kharīda of Imad ad-Din al-Isfahani, in the section on the poets of Egypt. The work describes in some detail his travels in Sicily, especially in the muqaddima (prologue). It is also critical to establishing Abu'l-Qasim's family tree.

=== Editions ===
- Dīwān, ed., Khalīl Muṭrān. Cairo: Maṭbaʿat al-Jawāʾib, 1905.
- Dīwān, ed., Sihām al-Furayḥ. Kuwait: Maktabat al-Muʿallā, 1988.
- Tarassul Ibn Qalāqis al-Iskandarī, ed., ʿAbd al-ʿAzīz ibn Naṣīr al-Māniʿ. Riyadh: Jāmiʿat al-Malik Saʿūd, 1984.
- Al-Zahr al-bāsim wa-l-ʿarf al-nāsim fī madīḥ al-ajall Abī ʾl-Qāsim, ed., ʿAbd al-ʿAzīz ibn Naṣīr al-Māniʿ. Riyadh: Jāmiʿat al-Malik Saʿūd, 1984.
  - Translated into Italian by Adalgisa De Simone, ed., Splendori e misteri di Sicilia in un'opera di Ibn Qalāqis. Messina, 1996.
