= Hitlers Zweites Buch (1928) =

Hitler's unpublished second book, focusing on foreign policy

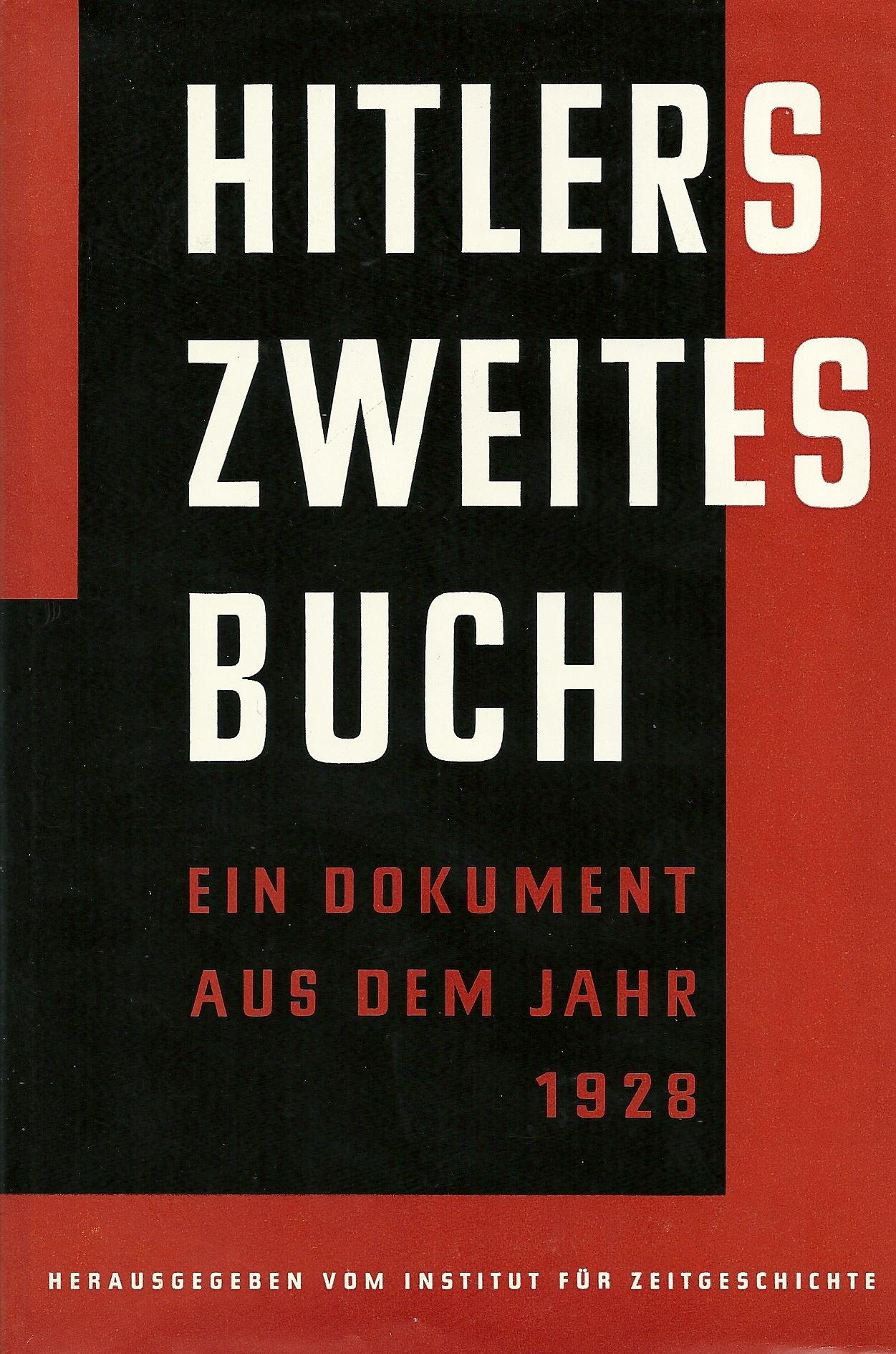
- 1961 German-language hardcover edition
- Author: Adolf Hitler
- Language: German
- Subject: Autobiography, political theory
- Publication place: Germany
- Pages: 197
- LC Class: DD247.H5
- Preceded by: Mein Kampf
- Followed by: Hitler's Table Talk

Hitlers Zweites Buch (German: [ˈtsvaɪ̯təs buːx], "Second Book"), published in English as Hitler's Secret Book and later as Hitler's Second Book, consists of Adolf Hitler's unedited thoughts on foreign policy in 1928. Written after Mein Kampf, it was not published in his lifetime.

Gerhard Weinberg – who edited and annotated the original German edition, and one of the two published English editions – speculates that the Zweites Buch was not published in 1928 because Mein Kampf did not sell well at that time and Hitler's publisher, the Franz-Eher-Verlag, may have told Hitler that a second book would hinder sales even more. Zweites Buch was written after the Nazi Party's poor showing in the 1928 German elections, which Hitler believed was caused by the public's misunderstanding of his ideas.

== Contents ==
- War and Peace
- The Necessity of Strife
- Race and Will in the Struggle for Power
- Elements of Foreign Policy
- National Socialist Foreign Policy
- German Needs and Aims
- Policies of the Second Reich
- Military Power and Fallacy of Border Restoration as Goal
- Hopelessness of an Economic Situation
- On Necessity for an Active Foreign Policy
- Germany and Russia
- German Foreign Policy
- German Goals
- England as an Ally
- Italy as an Ally
- Summary

== Zweites Buch and Mein Kampf ==
There are a number of similarities and differences between Zweites Buch and Mein Kampf. As in Mein Kampf, Hitler declared that the Jews were his eternal and most dangerous opponents. As in Mein Kampf, Hitler outlined what the German historian Andreas Hillgruber has called his Stufenplan ("stage-by-stage plan"). Hitler himself never used the term Stufenplan, which was coined by Hillgruber in his 1965 book Hitlers Strategie. Briefly, the Stufenplan called for three stages. In the first stage, there would be a massive military build-up, the overthrow of the shackles of the Treaty of Versailles, and the forming of alliances with Fascist Italy and the British Empire. The second stage would be a series of fast, "lightning wars" in conjunction with Italy and the United Kingdom against France and whichever of her allies in Eastern Europe—such as Czechoslovakia, Poland, Romania and Yugoslavia—chose to stand by her. The third stage would be a war to obliterate what Hitler considered to be the "Judeo-Bolshevik" regime in the Soviet Union.

=== The "fourth stage" ===
In contrast to Mein Kampf, in Zweites Buch Hitler added a fourth stage to the Stufenplan. He insinuated that in the far future a struggle for world domination might take place between the United States and a European alliance comprising a new association of nations, consisting of individual states with high national value. Zweites Buch also offers a different perspective on the U.S. than that outlined in Mein Kampf. In Mein Kampf Hitler declared that Germany's most dangerous opponent on the international scene was the Soviet Union; in Zweites Buch, Hitler declared that, for immediate purposes, the Soviet Union was still the most dangerous opponent, but that, in the long term, the most dangerous potential opponent was the United States.

== Habitat argument ==
In the first two chapters Hitler claims the balance between population and natural resources to be the main focus of any nation.

The starting point of his analysis is the "struggle for daily bread" (food production) as the basis of human society. From this need for self-preservation, he develops his central idea of the relationship between the population and the size of the habitat of a people. If the habitat cannot provide sufficient resources for survival, degeneration and a decline of the nation results. Hitler raises the struggle for adequate habitat to a central principle of human history. Hitler points out that this battle is often enforced militarily, as history has adequately demonstrated.

As solutions to the struggle for living space, Hitler considers birth control, emigration of the population, increased food production, and increased exports to buy additional food. All of these alternatives he finds problematic. Birth control and emigration he believes leads to a weakening of the nation, as people are the true life-blood of the nation. The increase of food production he declares to be fundamentally limited by a finite amount of productive land. Greater exports he discards because it leads to increased market competition with other nations, making Germany dependent on outside nations and therefore leading to the situation Germany faced with the start of World War I in 1914. Hitler revisits these arguments several times in subsequent chapters.

== Foreign policy ==
In the other chapters Hitler developed his thoughts on the future National Socialist foreign policy that serves the struggle for living space. As in Mein Kampf, Hitler claims that the Jews are the eternal and most dangerous opponents of the German people; he also outlines and elaborates on his future political plans.

Hitler states that National Socialist foreign policy was to be based on Lebensraum for the German people:

The National Socialist Movement, on the contrary, will always let its foreign policy be determined by the necessity to secure the space necessary to the life of our Folk. It knows no Germanising or Teutonising, as in the case of the national bourgeoisie, but only the spread of its own Folk. It will never see in the subjugated, so called Germanised, Czechs or Poles a national, let alone Folkish, strengthening, but only the racial weakening of our Folk.

== Ideas on international relations ==
Of all of Germany's potential enemies comprising the eventual Allies of World War II, Hitler ranked the U.S. as the most dangerous. By contrast, Hitler saw the United Kingdom as a fellow "Aryan" power that in exchange for Germany's renunciation of naval and colonial ambitions would ally itself with Germany. France, in Hitler's opinion, was rapidly "Negroizing" itself. In regard to the Soviet Union, Hitler dismissed the Russian people as being Slavic Untermenschen ("sub-humans") incapable of intelligent thought. Hitler consequently believed that the Russian people were ruled by what he regarded as a gang of bloodthirsty but inept Jewish revolutionaries.

=== United Kingdom ===
In Zweites Buch, Hitler called for an Anglo-German alliance based on political expediency as well as the notion that the two Germanic powers were natural allies. Hitler argued that the alleged British striving for a balance of power leading to an Anglo-German alliance would not conflict with his goal of Germany being the dominant continental power because it was wrong to believe that "England fought every hegemonic power immediately", but rather was prepared to accept dominant states whose aims were "obviously and purely continental in nature". Hitler went on to write that "Of course no one in Britain will conclude an alliance for the good of Germany, but only in the furtherance of British interests." Nonetheless, because Hitler believed that there was an ongoing struggle between the "Jewish invasion" and the "old British tradition" for the control of the United Kingdom, Hitler believed the chances for Anglo-German alliance to be good provided the "Jewish invasion" was resisted successfully. Hitler hedged somewhat, however, by claiming that:

The instincts of Anglo-Saxondom are still so sharp and alive that one cannot speak of a complete victory of Jewry, but rather, in part the latter is still forced to adjust its interests to those of the English. If the Jew were to triumph in England, English interests would recede into the background.... [But] if the Briton triumphs then a shift of England's attitude vis-à-vis Germany can still take place."

== Publication history ==
The German text of the book was originally published in Munich, Germany in 1961 by the Institute for Contemporary History. It was edited and annotated by Gerhard Weinberg. An English translation by Salvator Attanasio was published by Grove Press in 1961, as Hitler's Secret Book, with an introduction by Telford Taylor, who was a prosecutor at the Nuremberg trials. This hasty and inaccurate edition fell out of print, but was republished by Random House in 1987; this also went out of print.

A new translation by Krista Smith was published in 2003 by Enigma Books, a small press, under the title Hitler's Second Book, once again edited by Weinberg.

== See also ==
- List of books by or about Adolf Hitler
- Consequences of the attack on Pearl Harbor
