= Abu al-Qasim ibn Hammud ibn al-Hajar =

12th-century Arab leader and official in Sicily

Abu al-Qasim ibn Hammud ibn al-Hajar (Arabic: أبو القاسم بن حمود بن الحجر, romanized: Abū al-Qāsim ibn Ḥammūd ibn al-Ḥajar) was a senior official or Qaid (qāʾid, Arabic for 'commander') of the Norman Kingdom of Sicily, and a leader of the Muslim community of Sicily.

== Origin and family ==
Abu al-Qasim ibn Hammud was an eminent person: the contemporary traveller Ibn Jubayr called him "the hereditary leader of the Muslims of Sicily", and the chronicler Hugo Falcandus calls him "the most noble and powerful of the Sicilian Muslims". The poet Ibn Qalaqis, who was his guest and client while on the island, claimed that Abu al-Qasim descended from Muhammad via his daughter Fatimah and Ali ibn Abi Talib, the Idrisid dynasty of Morocco, and the Hammudid dynasty of al-Andalus. However, the explicit link between Abu al-Qasim's family, the Banu Hajar, and the Hammudids is unknown, and although the claimed ancestors were Shi'a, Abu al-Qasim himself was most likely Sunni, since he named his sons after the first three caliphs, casting doubts on Ibn Qalaqis' claims. Indeed, Abu al-Qasim himself is recorded as claiming once to be descended from the Umayyad caliph Umar ibn Abd al-Aziz. Several scholars have tried in the past to link Abu al-Qasim's ancestry with a certain Chamutus, who defended Enna against the Norman conqueror Roger I in 1087, but this is not substantiated.

Abu al-Qasim's father, Abu Abdallah Hammud, was also a qāʾid. He may be the Ibn Abi'l-Qasim who was the patron of Ibn Zafar al-Siqilli, and, to whom the latter dedicated his mirror for princes. Abu al-Qasim's brother, Abu Ali Hasan, was a scholar and jurist (faqīh).

== Life ==
The historian Jeremy Johns suggests that Abu al-Qasim ibn Hammud is first mentioned in a loan agreement of September 1162, where Caitus Bulqassemus ('the Qaid Abu al-Qasim') is mentioned. In 1167, Abu al-Qasim supported the master chamberlain, Richard the Qaid, in his designs against the chancellor, Stephen du Perche. Falcandus claims that this was because Stephen seemed to favour his rival, the Qaid Sedictus, "the richest of the Muslims" (possibly to be identified with al-Sadid Abu al-Makarim Hibat Allah ibn al-Husri).

Abu al-Qasim was a patron of scholars and poets, including Ibn Qalaqis, the poet al-Umawi, and the faqīh Abu Ali Hasan ibn Hammud. Other members of this circle were the judge (qāḍī) Abu Abdallah Muhammad ibn Raja and members of the court and government such as Richard the Qaid, the military commander Gharat ibn Jawshan, or the scholar (ḥakīm) Abu Amr Uthman ibn al-Muhadhdhib al-Judhami.

Abu al-Qasim clearly had a position at the royal council (dīwān in Arabic), being mentioned twice as its member in documents, in June 1168 and again in November 1173, while Ibn Qalaqis compared him to legendary administrators such as Abd al-Hamid ibn Yahya, or the Buyid viziers Abu al-Fadl Muhammad ibn al-Husayn, Abu al-Qasim Isma'il ibn al-Abbas, and Abu Ishaq Ibrahim ibn Hilal. He appears to have fallen from favour at court sometime after, but, according to Ibn Jubayr, in 1184/5 he was still occasionally employed in government affairs. By that time, Abu al-Qasim had become disillusioned with the prospects of continued Norman rule for the Muslims of Sicily, as the Norman kings exerted pressure on Muslims to convert to Christianity. In 1175, he is known to have sent letters to Saladin urging him to conquer Sicily, and a decade later, shortly before he was met by Ibn Jubayr, he was accused of sending similar proposals to the Almohads of Morocco, and was forced to pay fines and surrender much of his property.

His subsequent fate is unknown, but only four years after his meeting with Ibn Jubayr, the first of a series of Muslim rebellion broke out in Sicily, that would eventually lead to the complete eradication of Islam from the island. Some of his descendants certainly remained on the island, but with Christian names, in the 13th century.

== Sources ==
- Johns, Jeremy (2002). Arabic Administration in Norman Sicily: The Royal Dīwān. Cambridge and New York: Cambridge University Press. ISBN 978-0-521-81692-2.
