= Herbert Lüthy =

Swiss historian and journalist (1918–2002)

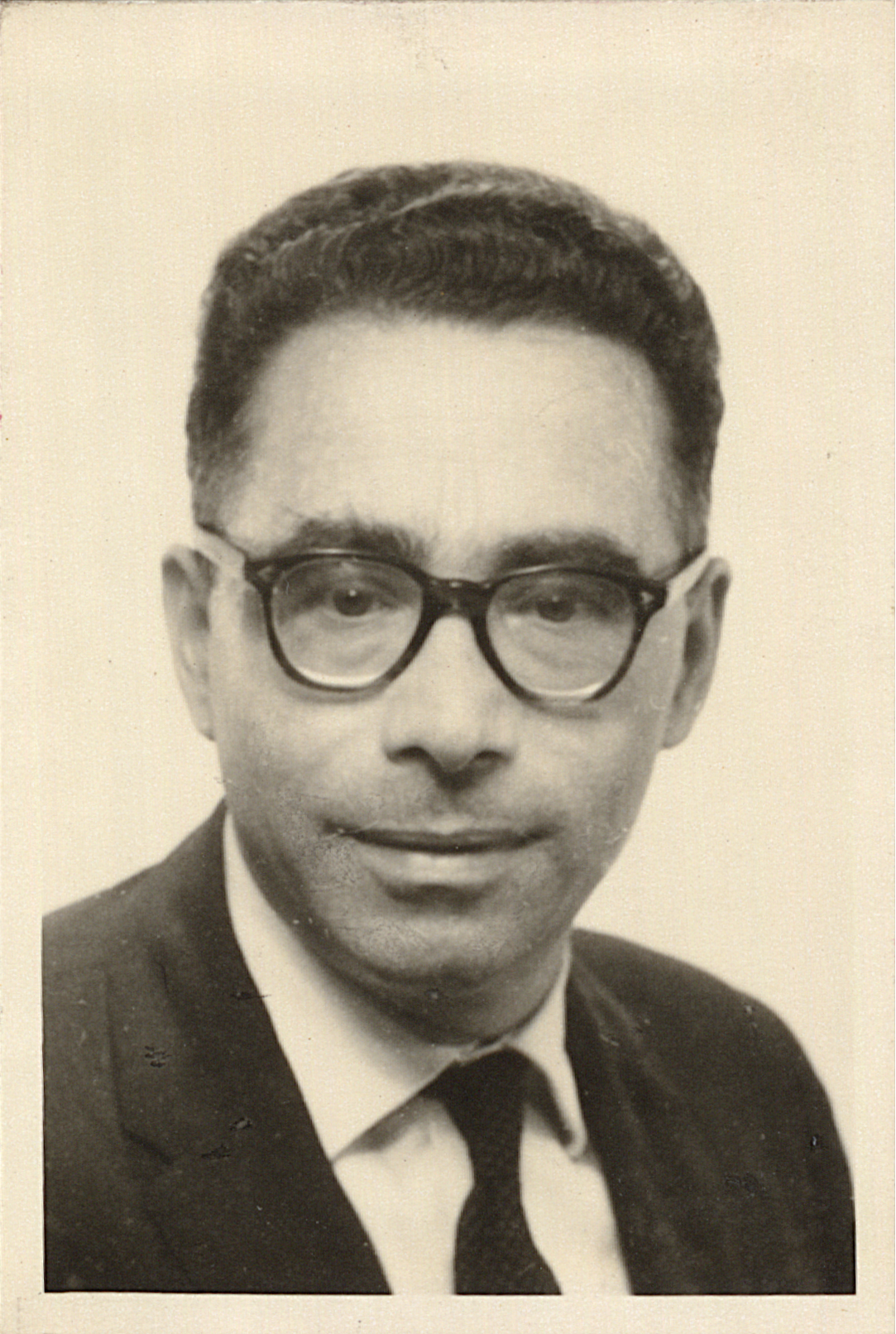
Herbert Lüthy

Herbert Lüthy (January 15, 1918 - November 16, 2002) was a Swiss historian and journalist. His book France Against Herself, published in the mid-1950s, criticized French traditionalism.

== Life ==
Born in Basel, Herbert Lüthy attended school in Glarus and St. Gallen. He then studied at the universities of Paris, Geneva and Zürich, gaining a PhD in history in 1942. He became a journalist, writing for the St. Galler Tagblatt during World War II. From 1946 to 1958 he lived in Paris, writing for Melvin J. Lasky's magazine Der Monat. He also wrote for Encounter. In 1958 he became Professor of Education and History at ETH Zurich. In 1971 he moved to the University of Basel, retiring for health reasons in 1980. He died in Basel in 2002.

== Works ==
Books

- (tr. into German) Essais by Michel de Montaigne, Zurich: Manesse Verlag, 1953
- Frankreichs Uhren Gehen Anders (French clocks tick differently), Zürich: Europa Verlag, 1954. Translated by Eric Mosbacher as France against herself : a perceptive study of France's past, her politics, and her unending crises., New York: Praeger, 1955; published in England as The state of France; a study of contemporary France, London: Secker & Warburg, 1955
- La Banque Protestante en France, de la Revocation de l'Edit de Nantes à la Révolution, Paris: S.E.V.P.E.N, 2 vols, 1959-1961
- Nach dem Untergang des Abendlandes; zeitkritische Essays
- Le passé présent: combats d'idées de Calvin à Rousseau, Monaco: Éditions du Rocher, 1965. Translated by Salvator Attanasio as From Calvin to Rousseau; tradition and modernity in socio-political thought from the Reformation to the French Revolution, 1970
- In Gegenwart der Geschichte. Historische Essays, 1967
- Fahndung nach dem Dichter Bertolt Brecht, 1972

Articles

- "Die Vierte Republik" (The Fourth Republic), Der Monat 10 (July 1949), pp. 39–48
