= Jacques Godechot =

French historian (1907–1989)

- Born: 3 January 1907; Lunéville
- Died: 24 August 1989 (aged 82)

Academic work
- Discipline: Historian
- Sub-discipline: Atlantic history, French Revolution
- Institutions: University of Toulouse University of Toulouse-Jean Jaurès

Jacques Léon Godechot (3 January 1907 – 24 August 1989) was a French historian of the French Revolution and a pioneer of Atlantic history. He was the Dean of the Faculty of Letters and human sciences at the University of Toulouse from 1961 to 1971.

Godechot was born in 1907 in Lunéville. He was appointed to the Faculty of Letters of Toulouse in 1945 and taught there until 1980.

As a frequent and varied contributor to the Annales Historiques de la Révolution Française, he acted as "a mediator, an intermediary between readers of the journal and Anglo-Saxon and Italian historiography of the Revolution". His emphasis on the international dimension of the late-18th- and early-19th-century revolutions was crystallized in the concepts of Atlantic history and 'occidental revolution'. In 1955, Godechot collaborated with the Yale historian Robert Roswell Palmer to present a joint paper on 'the problem of Atlantic history' at the 10th International Congress of Historical Sciences in Rome.

== Works ==
- Histoire de l'Atlantique, Paris: Bordas, 1947
- Les institutions de la France sous la Révolution et l'émpire, Paris: Presses Universitaires de France, 1951
- (with R. R. Palmer) 'Le problème de l’Atlantique du XVIIIième au XXième siècle.' Comitato internazionale di scienze storiche. X8 Congresso internazionale di Scienze storiche, Roma 4–11 Settembre 1955. Relazioni 5 (Storia contemporanea). Florence, 1955: 175–239
- La grande nation: l'expansion révolutionnaire de la France dans le monde de 1789 à 1799, Paris: Aubier, 1956.
- La contre-révolution: doctrine et action, 1789-1804, Paris Presses universitaires de France, 1961. Translated by Salvator Attanasio as The counter-revolution: doctrine and action, 1789-1804, 1971.
- La pensée révolutionnaire en France et en Europe, 1780-1799, Paris: A. Colin, 1963
- L'Europe et l'Amérique à l'époque napoléonienne (1800-1815), Paris: Presses universitaires de France, 1967
- La prise de la Bastille 14 juillet 1789, Paris: Gallimard, 1965. Translated by Jean Stewart, with an introduction by Charles Tilly as The taking of the Bastille, July 14th, 1789, 1970
- Les Révolutions, 1770–1799, Paris: Presses universitaires de France, 1963. Translated by Herbert H. Rowen as France and the Atlantic revolution of the eighteenth century, 1770-1799, 1965.
- (with Beatrice Fry Hyslop and David L. Dowd) The Napoleonic era in Europe, New York: Holt, Rinehart and Winston, 1971.
- Les Constitutions de la France depuis 1789, Flammarion, Paris, 1979 ISBN 9782081444324.
- (ed.) Considérations sur la Révolution française by Madame de Staël
