= Ibn Zafar al-Siqilli =

12th-century Arab-Sicilian philosipher

Hujjat al-Din Abu Abdallah Muhammad ibn Abi Muhammad ibn Muhammad ibn Zafar al-Siqilli (Arabic: حجة الدين أبو عبد الله محمد بن أبي محمد بن محمد بن ظفر الصقلي, romanized: Ḥujjat al-Dīn Abū ‘Abd Allāh Muḥammad ibn Abī Muḥammad ibn Muḥammad ibn Ẓafar al-Ṣiqillī), commonly known simply as Ibn Zafar al-Siqilli, was a philosopher, polymath and Arab-Sicilian politician of the Norman period (1104 - 1170), and has come to be known in the West as "Niccolò Machiavelli's Arab Precursor".

== Biography ==
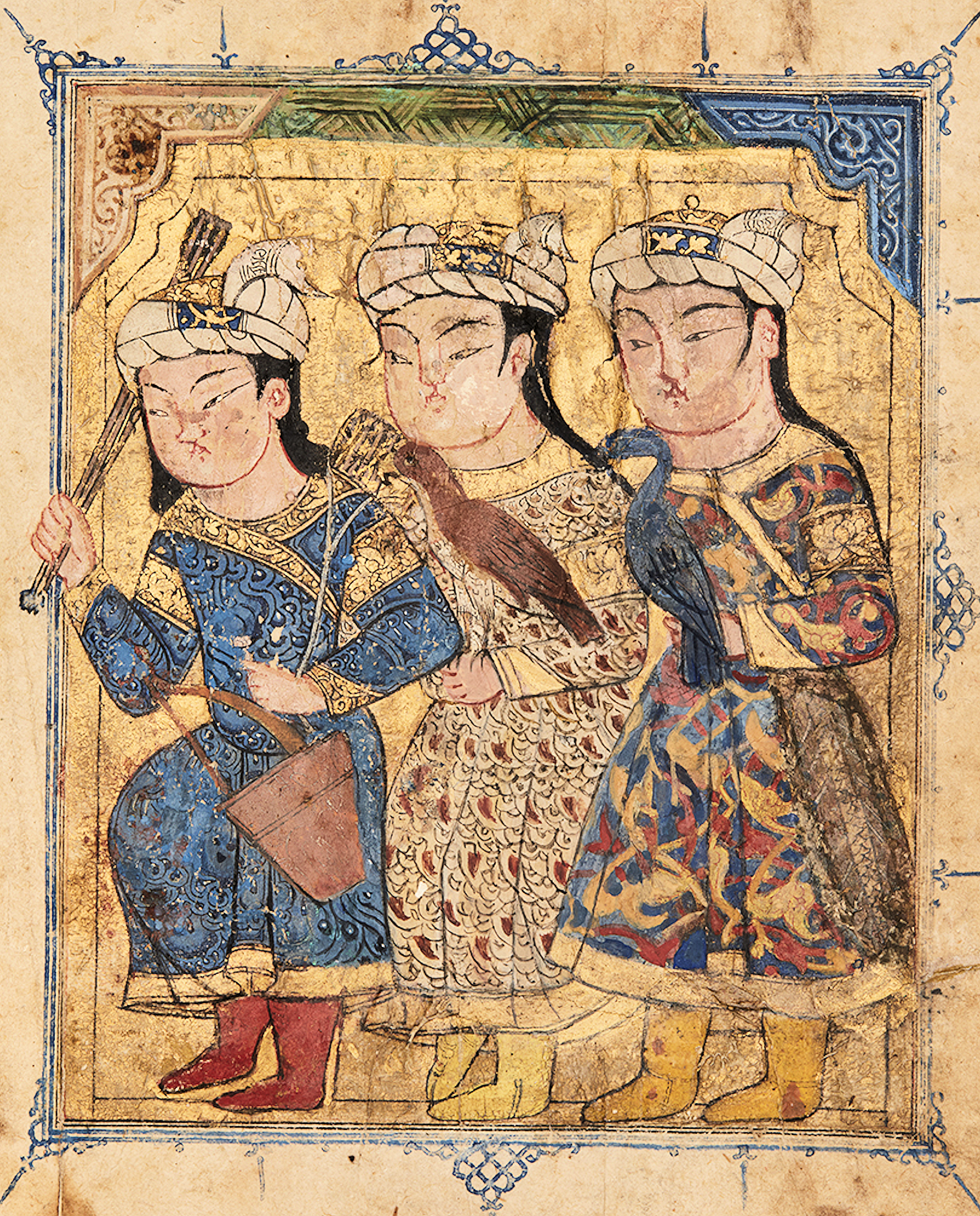
Frontispiece of Sulwan al-Muta’ fi ‘Udwan al-Atba’ by Ibn Zafar al-Siqilli, Egypt or Syria circa 1330 CE

Ibn Zafar was said to be physically small and frail. His nisbah "al-Siqillī" indicates he was born in Sicily, but the patronym "al-Makkī" suggests his family origins were in Mecca, where he is believed to have been raised and educated. Nicknamed 'The Wanderer', the precise chronology of his travels are uncertain. He probably spent his youth in Fatimid Egypt and Mahdia in Tunisia, but left there in 1148 when it fell to the Normans. After a period in Sicily, Ibn Zafar first went to Egypt, then to Aleppo in 1146, where he taught at the Madrasa Ibn Abi Asrun under the patronage of Safi al-Din. In 1154 he returned to Sicily under the patronage of Abu'l-Qasim ibn Hammud ibn al-Hajar, a Sicilian Arab noble. Due to the civil unrest of the Muslim population some time later, Ibn Zafar left Sicily definitively and took refuge in Hamat, in Syria, where he died in poverty in 1170, or 1172. The geographer Yaqut al-Hamawi referred to him as a 'refined philologist', and both Shams al-Din al-Dhahabi and Ibn Khallikan praised his scholarship and thought.

== Literary career ==
Ibn Zafar was said to have authored 32 books.

=== Sulwan, or Waters of Comfort ===
Sulwān al-Muṭā fī Udwān al-Atbā (Arabic: سلوان المطاع في عدوان الأتباع, lit. 'Consolation for the Ruler During the Hostility of his Subjects') is his magnum opus. When Niccolò Machiavelli, the famous Florentine, dedicated his treatise, 'The Prince', to Lorenzo di Medici four centuries later, Ibn Zafar was almost unknown to the Western world. He remained in relative obscurity even after Michele Amari's Italian translation appeared in 1851. Amari's introduction had included a biographical account of Ibn Zafar and his manuscript's history, and Richard Bentley published an English version in 1852. The original version was written in Sicily in the 12th century. At the beginning of the 20th century another Sicilian and political scientist philosopher, Gaetano Mosca, wrote of the striking parallels between Ibn Ẓafar's treatise and Machiavelli's. Ibn Ẓafar's name is rarely credited as the precursor to its famous successor.

The treatise is a form of wisdom literature with a long Arabian and Persian tradition, called "mirrors for princes", which purported to be handbooks for princes and caliphs offering counsel on the proper use of power, good governance and the conduct of commerce and trade. Ibn Zafar dedicated the first edition of Sulwan to an unknown king facing revolt - possibly the ruler of Damascus expelled by Nur ad-Din - and the second edition to his patron Abu'l-Qasim ibn Hammud ibn al-Hajar.

=== Other works ===
A Biography of Illustrious Men, translated into Italian, English and Turkish.

== Bibliography ==
- Richard Hrair Dekmejian and Adel Fathy Thabit: Machiavelli's Arab Precursor: Ibn Zafar al-Siquilli; British Journal of Middle Eastern Studies (2000), 27, 125-137.
- Carl Brockelmann, Geschichte der arabischen Literatur, Vol. 1. Weimar 1898.
- Rachel Arié, Miniatures hispano-musulmanes, Leyden (E. J. Brill) 1969.
- Umberto Rizzitano, Ibn Ẓafar, Abū ‘Abd Allāh in Encyclopaedia of Islam, Vol. IV, p. 970.
- Emeri J. van Donzel, Islamic Desk Reference
