= Salvator Attanasio =

American literary translator

Salvator Attanasio (September 9, 1913 – June 3, 1993) was an American literary translator, who translated over 200 works of literature, history and philosophy.

Attanasio translated the autobiographies of Marlene Dietrich and Alexandra Kollantai, biographies of Dante and Goethe, philosophical works by Etienne Gilson, and work by a variety of Roman Catholic writers, including Hans Küng and Joseph Ratzinger.

== Works ==
=== Translations ===
- The Victory of Father Karl by Otto Pies. Translated from the German. 1957
- A Priest and his Dog by Jean Gautier. Translated from the French. 1957.
- Make Your Mind Work for You by Jean Guitton. Translated from the French. 1958.
- The Dead Sea scrolls and primitive Christianity by Jean Daniélou. Translated from the French Manuscrits de la mer Morte et les origines du christianisme. 1958.
- Belgium by Paul Schoenen. Translated from the German. 1959.
- Central Italy: Tuscany and Umbria by Wolfgang Braunfels. Translated from the German. 1959.
- Dance on the volcano by Marie Chauvet. Translated from the French La danse sur le volcan. 1959.
- (tr. with Otto de Vuchetich) Story of the Turks, from empire to democracy by Richard Peters. 1959.
- Mountain without Stars by Maurice Zermatten. Translated from the French La Montagne sans étoiles. 1960.
- Captain of the Ile by Raoul de Beaudéan. Translated from the French Service a la mer. 1960.
- God of the scientists: God of the experiment by Rémy Chauvin. 1960.
- Hitler's Secret Book by Adolf Hitler. Translated from the German Hitlers zweites Buch, with an introduction by Telford Taylor. 1961.
- Père Jacques by Michel Carrouges. Translated from the French. 1961.
- The peace of St. Francis by Maria Sticco. Translated from the Italian, with an introduction by Agostino Gemelli. 1962.
- The call of St. Clare by Henri Daniel-Rops. Translated from the French Claire dans la clarté. 1963.
- An opportunity for faith by Wilfrid Busenbender. Translated from the German Die Welt als Chance des Glaubens. 1963.
- The Arabs: a compact history by Francesco Gabrieli. 1963.
- The book of Joseph by Renée Zeller. Translated from the French Joseph le charpentier. 1963.
- The Popes: Papal history in picture and word by Leonard von Matt and Hans Kühner. Translated from the German Die Päpste. 1963.
- Wit and wisdom of good Pope John by Henri Fesquet. Translated from the French. 1964.
- Structures of the Church by Hans Küng. Translated from the German Strukturen der Kirche. 1964.
- The Secret Ways of Prayer by R. L. Bruckberger, O.P. Translated from the French. 1964.
- (tr. with Darrell Likens Guder) The Easter Message today: 3 essays by Leonhard Goppelt, Helmut Thielicke and Hans-Rudolf Müller-Schwefe. Translated from the German. 1964.
- The life and times of St. Francis by Agostino Ghilardi. 1965.
- Russia invaded; from Genghis Khan to Hitler by Mario Francini. 1965.
- (tr. with others) Nazi culture. Intellectual, cultural and social life in the Third Reich ed. by George L. Mosse. 1965.
- Forms and substances in the arts by Etienne Gilson. Translated from the French Matieres et formes. 1966.
- The life and times of Goethe by Horst Hohendorf. Translated from the German. 1967.
- The German question ed. by Walther Hubatsch et al. Translated from the German Die deutsche Frage. 1967.
- The life and times of Dante by Maria Luisa Rizzatti. Translated from the Italian. 1967.
- Manuel de Falla by Suzanne Demarquez. Translated from the French. 1968.
- Cervantes; his life, his times, his works ed. by Thomas Goddard Bergin. Translated from the Italian. 1970.
- From Calvin to Rousseau; tradition and modernity in socio-political thought from the Reformation to the French Revolution by Herbert Lüthy. Translated from the French Le passé présent: combats d'idées de Calvin à Rousseau. 1970.
- The search for a third way; My path between East and West by Heinz Brandt. Translated from the German Ein Traum, der nicht entführbar ist. 1970.
- The Eternal Yes by Karl Rahner. Translated from the German. 1970.
- Philosophy, technology, and the arts in the early modern era by Paolo Rossi. Translation from the Italian I filosofi e le macchine, edited by Benjamin Nelson. 1970.
- The counter-revolution: doctrine and action, 1789-1804 by Jacques Godechot. Translated from the French. 1971.
- The Autobiography of a sexually emancipated Communist woman by Alexandra Kollantai. Translated from the German Autobiographie einer sexuell emanzipierten Kommunistin, with an introduction by Germaine Greer. 1971.
- The Church and the Sacraments by Louis Eveley. Translated from the French. 1971.
- Columbus was Chinese: discoveries and inventions of the Far East by Hans Breuer. Translated from the German Kolumbus war Chinese. 1972.
- Questions, answers, questions: from the biography of a German Marxist by Robert Havemann. Translated from the German Fragen, Antworten, Fragen. 1972.
- The key to heaven: editing tales from Holy Scripture to serve as teaching and warning by Leszek Kołakowski. 1972.
- Blessed is the peace of my church by Yves Congar. Translated from the French. 1973.
- How to read the Bible : twenty-five lessons in dialogue form with reading lessons for thirty-three weeks by Jean Martucci. Translated from the French Comment lire la Bible. 1973.
- Allow yourself to be forgiven: penance today by Karl Rahner. Translation from the German Man darf sich vergeben lassen. 1974.
- The sky-god An-Anu by Herman Wohlstein. Translation from the German. 1976.
- Never again without a rifle : the origins of Italian terrorism by Alessandro Silj. Translated from the Italian Mai più senza fucile!. 1977.
- Exodus, a hermeneutics of freedom by J. Severino Croatto. Translated from the Spanish. 1978.
- Freedom and domination: a historical critique of civilization by Alexander Rüstow. Abbreviated translation from the German Ortsbestimmung der Gegenwart. 1980. Ed. with an intro. by Dankwart A. Rustow
- I wish I could believe by Juan López-Pedraz. Translated from Cuando se está perdiendo la fe. 1983.
- The last day of Jesus an enriching portrayal of the passion by Gerhard Lohfink. Translated from the German. 1984.
- (tr. with Graham Harrison) The Ratzinger report : an exclusive interview on the state of the Church by Joseph Ratzinger with Vittorio Messori. Translated from the authorized German manuscript. 1985.
- The court-martial of Jesus: a Christian defends the Jews against the charge of deicide by Weddig Fricke. Translated from the German Standrechtlich gekreuzigt. 1990.
- What are the Targums? : selected texts by Pierre Grelot. Translated from the French Les Targoums. 1992.

=== Other works ===
- 'A surgical survey of a center of learning' in Sebastiano Martelli, ed., Rimanelliana : studi su Giose Rimanelli = studies on Giose Rimanelli, 2000.
