= Carlo Alfonso Nallino =

Italian orientalist (1872–1938)

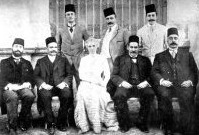
Staff of the Egyptian University, 1911. Nallino is on the left.

Carlo Alfonso Nallino (18 February 1872 – 25 July 1938) was an Italian orientalist.

== Biography ==
Nallino was born in Turin, and studied literature under Italo Pizzi at the University of Turin. From 1896 he taught in the Istituto Universitario Orientale of Naples and then at the University of Palermo (1902–1913). By the age of 21 Nallino had gained an international reputation for his publication of an Arabic manuscript by the celebrated tenth-century Arab astronomer al-Battānī.

With his publication of a book on Egyptian Arab dialect in 1900 he was invited by King Fuad I of Egypt to teach at the Egyptian Khedive University. Amongst his pupils there was Taha Husayn, who would go on to become Minister of the Education.

Letter by Nallino (1932)

Nallino eventually returned to Italy to take up the position of ordinary professor at the University La Sapienza of Rome, where, in 1921, he had founded the Istituto per l'Oriente, which published the monthly journal Oriente Moderno. In 1933 he was named member of the Royal Academy of Arab Language in Cairo, and he was a member of the Italian Accademia Nazionale dei Lincei and of the Royal Academy of Italy. In 1938 he travelled for two months in the Arabic Peninsula, visiting the newly formed Kingdom of Saudi Arabia, but he died shortly afterwards in Rome from a cardiac arrest after publishing only the first volumes of the studies about his trip,

== Publications ==
- Revision of Storia dei Musulmani di Sicilia by Michele Amari (1854), repr. in 5 volumes, Catania, R. Prampolini, 1933-35.
- Chrestomathia Qorani Arabica (1893).
- Al-Battānī sive Albatenii opus astronomicum: ad fidem codicis Escurialensis Arabice editum, (1899 - 1907); the Latin title of al-Battānī's Kitāb Zīj al-Ṣābī’ (كتاب زيج الصابئ) ; multi-volume scientific treatise on geography and astronomy from Arabic manuscript, translated in 12th cent. Latin by Plato Tiburtinus, with Latin annotations.

== Bibliography ==
- Amari, Michele (1854). Nallino, Carlo Alfonso (ed.). Storia dei Musulmani di Sicilia (in Italian). Vol. I. Firenze: Felice le Monnier.
- Amari, Michele (1858). Nallino, Carlo Alfonso (ed.). Storia dei Musulmani di Sicilia (in Italian). Vol. II. Firenze: Felice le Monnier.
- Nallino, Carlo Alfonso, ed. (1893). Chrestimathia Qorani Arabica. Lipsiae: Sumptibus W. Gerhard.
- Battānī (al-), Muḥammad ibn Jabir (1899). Al-Battānī sive Albatenii opus astronomicum: ad fidem codicis Escurialensis Arabice editum (Kitāb Zīj al-Ṣābī') (in Arabic). Vol. 3. Mediolani Insubrum: Prostat apud Urlichum Hoeplium.
- Sterlich, Rinaldo de (1900). Nallino, Carlo Alfonso (ed.). L'arabo parlato in Egitto; grammatica, dialoghi e raccolta di circa 6000 vocaboli. Forma la nuova ed. completamente rifatta del Manuale dell'arabo volgare di de Sterlich e Dib Khaddag (in Italian). Milano: Manuali Hoepli.
