= Michele Amari =

Italian politician (1806–1889)

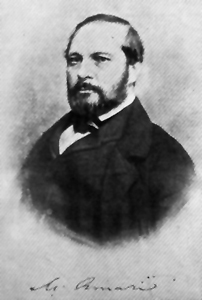
- Michele Amari
- Born: 7 July 1806; Palermo
- Died: 16 July 1889 (aged 83); Florence
- Occupations: civil servant (1820–42), professor (1859–66), minister of education (1862–64), senator (1861–89)
- Notable work: History of the War of the Sicilian Vespers (1842)

Michele Benedetto Gaetano Amari (7 July 1806 in Palermo – 16 July 1889 in Florence) was a Sicilian patriot, liberal revolutionary and politician of aristocratic background, historian and orientalist. He rose to prominence as a champion of Sicilian independence from the Neapolitan Bourbon rule when he published his history of the War of the Sicilian Vespers in 1842. He was a minister in the Sicilian revolutionary government of 1848–9 and in Garibaldi's revolutionary cabinet in Sicily in 1860. Having embraced the cause of Italian unification, he helped prepare the annexation of Sicily by the Kingdom of Sardinia and was active in his later years as a senator of the Kingdom of Italy.

== Biography ==
=== Family background ===
In his memoirs, Amari portrayed his paternal grandfather Michele as a wealthy attorney who lived "on the third floor" of a house in central Palermo, on the corner of Via del Cassaro and Strada della Mercede. But the historian's relation to his cousin and frequent correspondent, also Michele, later Count Amari of Sant'Adriano, who largely shared his political trajectory, reveals Amari's father Ferdinando (d. 1850) to have been a younger son of Michele (c.1740–1820), the third Count Amari of Sant'Adriano from 1767. The title was acquired for the family by the latter's grandfather and namesake, Michele Amari, in 1722. The first Count, whose position derived from the hereditary office of the administrator of the royal tobacco monopoly, added a rural villa of his own to the residential suburb of Piana dei Colli (Plain of the Hills), today a northern district of Palermo, on land purchased from the marquises della Torretta in 1720. The pursuit of education and direct involvement in governmental affairs may have distinguished the family among the Sicilian noble class.

=== Early life and education ===
Ferdinando was an accountant in the municipal bank of Palermo. His marriage to Giulia Venturelli, Amari's mother, was opposed by his family. Due to Ferdinando's financial troubles caused by gambling, Amari lived with his grandfather in central Palermo from 1814. Already from 1812 he claimed to remember the Duke of Orléans attending the nearby Mercedarian convent of Our Lady of Mercy with his Bourbon wife in 1812, shielded from the Palermo crowd by the loaded guns of English infantry ostensibly for fear of pestilence. The future King of France lived in the then British protectorate of Sicily in 1808–1814 as an agent of the Foreign Office, and conferred with Victor Emmanuel I in Sardinia on joint action against Napoleon I. Amari completed his education in Palermo, where most of his teachers were liberal clerics. Domenico Scinà, who taught Amari physics and political economy, was a leading historian of Sicily. The intellectual domination of English empiricism in Palermo's institutes and his father's Voltairianism prompted Amari, by his own account, to abandon the church by the age of twelve and embrace materialist philosophy by the age of thirteen. Amari's father introduced him to the Francophile democratic circles of Sicily and secured him a place at the Ministry of the Interior in February 1820. The death of his grandfather, the Count, brought Amari back to his father's house. In July 1820, Amari was involved alongside his father in the Palermo uprising of the Carbonari which demanded Sicilian independence and a liberal constitution. Ferdinando was initially sentenced to death in 1822 for his participation and only released from prison in 1834. Amari spent the subsequent years progressing through the ranks of civil administration, publishing translations of English authors (which earned him a letter of thanks from Walter Scott), and reading widely with political intent.

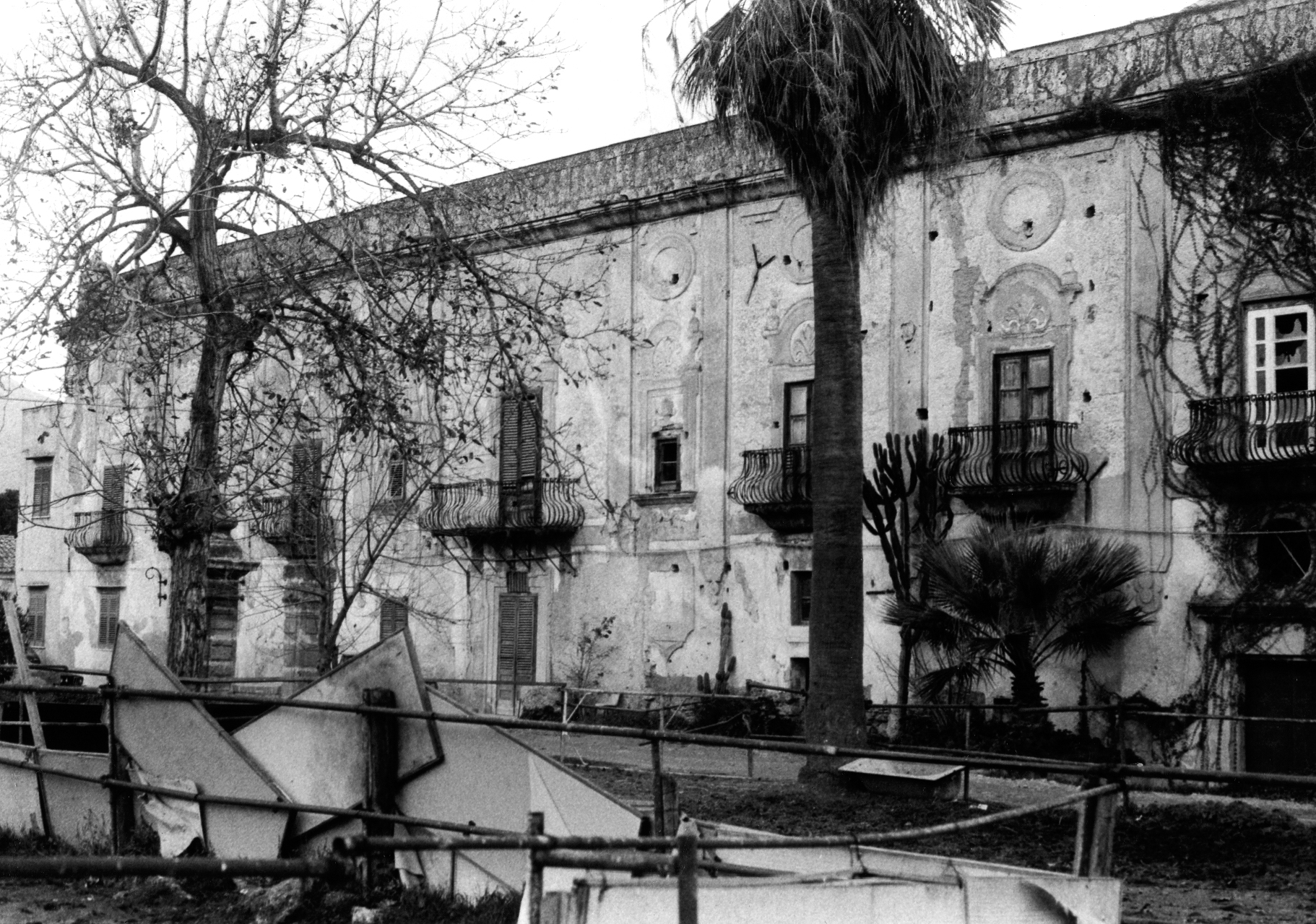
Villa Amari (38.17390504059211°N 13.305540638310259°E), a baroque residence in the Piana dei Colli (today Via Traversa 50/1 in the Cardillo district of Palermo), pictured in 1989. Built in 1720 by the first Count Amari of Sant'Adriano, it will have later belonged to the third Count, the historian's grandfather. The chapel of St Joseph on the ground floor served as the community church until the establishment of the Cardillo parish of St Silvia in 1958. In the 1930s, the villa passed into the hands of the Taormina family and by the 1990s was used in cosa nostra activities.

=== History of the War of the Sicilian Vespers and first exile ===
By 1837 he had prepared the outline of his principal work, a detailed investigation of the war of the Sicilian Vespers (1282–1302), which was conceived as a call to overthrowing the Bourbon rule in the Kingdom of the Two Sicilies. The publication was delayed by Amari's involvement in health administration during an outbreak of cholera in 1837 and by his subsequent transfer to Naples in 1838–40 where he carried out additional research in the state archives. The book, first released in 1842 with a title that understated its message to bypass censorship, rapidly won a mass audience in Sicily and on the Italian mainland, and caused concern in the Neapolitan government. Amari went into exile in Paris where he studied Arabic with Joseph Toussaint Reinaud. He moved in the French liberal elite circles, where his acquaintances included Alexandre Dumas, Jules Michelet, Jean Alexandre Buchon, Abel-François Villemain, Augustin Thierry and Adolphe Thiers.

=== Revolution of 1848 and renewed exile ===
During the Sicilian revolution of 1848, he travelled back to the island to take up the chair of public law at the University of Palermo. Elected a deputy to the Sicilian Parliament, he was subsequently nominated the Minister of Finance in the revolutionary government. From August 1848 to April 1849, he lobbied for the recognition of the Sicilian state in Paris and London. After an abortive return to Sicily in April 1849, he pursued scholarly work in Paris until May 1859, when he accepted a position in Arabic at the University of Pisa.

=== Role in the annexation of Sicily ===
In December 1859 he and his cousin Emerico, a philosopher of history, received appointments at the Istituto di studi superiori in Florence. Amari soon joined a committee of support for the Sicilian revolution and headed for the island in the wake of Giuseppe Garibaldi's Expedition of the Thousand, arriving in late June 1860. In July 1860, he became the Minister of Education and Public Works and then briefly Minister of External Affairs in Garibaldi's wartime government, before resigning in September over the dictator's refusal to pursue annexation of the island by the Kingdom of Sardinia as demanded by its Prime Minister Camillo Cavour. In the political conflicts surrounding the incorporation of Sicily into Piedmont, Amari sided with Cavour against Garibaldi. Although he opposed Giuseppe La Farina's early plan for immediate annexation and retained his own aspirations for Sicilian autonomy, he accepted (ostensibly due to his fear of the return of Neapolitan influence) that this self-government should be granted unilaterally by Piedmont only after Italian unification, rejected the notion of reviving the Sicilian parliament, and campaigned among the Sicilians for the unconditional approval of the annexation, while acting as an intermediary between King Victor Emmanuel II and Garibaldi. On 4 September, Amari drafted a proclamation of the plebiscite for approving annexation, along with an outline of special concessions to be awarded to Sicily from Turin. He resigned after Garibaldi appointed Antonio Mordini as the new head of the cabinet (prodictator, Garibaldi's deputy) on 17 September, refused the post of Sicilian historiographer offered to him by Mordini, and attacked Sicilian autonomists and independentists and Garibaldi's republicans in his letters. Against the background of Garibaldi's absence, the advance of Piedmontese troops into the Papal States, and the impatience of the Sicilian elites with the revolution, it was Amari's monarchist option that ultimately prevailed.

=== Later life and death ===
Amari was appointed a senator of the Kingdom of Sardinia in January 1861, two months before the proclamation of the Kingdom of Italy, as was his cousin Count Amari, who had remained in Turin, several weeks later.

Amari was the Minister of Education in the cabinets of Luigi Carlo Farini and Marco Minghetti from 7 December 1862 to 23 September 1864. He retired as academic in 1866 but continued publishing new works and holding public offices related to research and teaching. He lived in Florence until 1873, then in Rome, Pisa, and again in Rome from 1888. He died at Florence in 1889 and was buried in Palermo.

Amari married Louise Boucher in 1865; they had two daughters.

== Scholarship ==
Amari's historical works trace the formation of Sicily's national characteristics from the period of Muslim rule down to the nineteenth century. He viewed the arrival of the Muslims as a positive development in that it freed Sicily from the Byzantine rule that over nearly three centuries had impoverished the island through excessive taxation. He attributed much of modern Sicily's cultural and social legacy to the Islamic rule.

Having mastered Arabic in Paris, Amari acted as a forerunner of Oriental studies in Italy. His efforts earned him the recognition as one of 19th-century Europe's finest translators of medieval Arabic writings. His Storia dei musulmani di Sicilia (History of the Muslims of Sicily, 1854) has been translated into many languages, including into Arabic by a group of Egyptian scholars as recently as 2004. He left his collection of Oriental studies books and manuscripts to the Accademia dei Lincei.

In 1851, Amari published a translation into Italian of an Arabic work of the mirror for princes genre, which includes a biography of its author, the 12th-century medieval Sicilian Arab philosopher Ibn Zafar al Siqilli, considered a precursor of Machiavelli. Amari's version was translated into English by Bentley under the title Solwan, or Waters of Comfort in the following year.

His work proved influential with later historians of Islam: among them, in Italy, Leone Caetani, Francesco Gabrieli, Umberto Rizzitano and Paolo Minganti.

Heinrich Leberecht Fleischer of the University of Leipzig, in publishing two supplements to Amari's Siculo-Arabic Library, credited him with reviving Oriental studies in Italy.

== Views ==
A rationalist and a positivist, Amari exhibited a strong ethical sensibility, commitment to secularism and a notion of civic virtues, and indifference to religious disputes. He cited the works of Antoine Destutt de Tracy and Adam Smith as decisive in his intellectual formation.

== Principal works ==
- La guerra del Vespro siciliano (1842, first edition published as Un periodo delle istorie siciliane del secolo XIII; revised 9th edn. 1886: vol. 1, vol. 2, vol. 3) (English tr. of 2nd (?) edn. Francis Egerton, History of the War of the Sicilian Vespers, 3 vols., London 1850: vol. 1, vol. 2, vol. 3)
- "Frammenti di testi Arabi sulla Storia della Sicilia Musulmana", Archivio Storico Italiano, appendix no. 4 to vol. 16 (1847), pp. 9–88 (alternative copy)
- La Sicile et les Bourbons (1849)
- Solwan el Mota', ossiano Conforti politici di Ibn Zafer, arabo siciliano del XII secolo (1851; English tr. Solwan; Or, Waters of Comfort by Ibn Zafer, 2 vols., 1852: vol. 1, vol. 2)
- Storia dei musulmani di Sicilia (1854–1868: vol. 1, vol. 2, vol. 3; revised 2nd edn. 1933–1939)
- Biblioteca arabo-sicula ossia raccolta di testi arabici che toccano la geografia, la storia, le biografie, e la bibliografia della Sicilia (1857, Arabic texts; Italian tr. Biblioteca arabo-sicula, 1880: vol. 1, vol. 2)
- Carte comparée de la Sicile moderne avec la Sicile au XIIe siècle d'après Édrisi et d'autres géographes arabes (with Auguste Henri Dufour, 1859)
- "Nuovi ricordi arabici su la storia di Genova", Atti della Società Ligure di Storia Patria 5 (1867), pp. 551–635 (reprinted 1873)
- Le epigrafi arabiche di Sicilia trascritte, tradotte e illustrate, 4 vols. (1875–1885: vol. 1, vol. 2)
- Altre narrazioni del Vespro Siciliano, scritte nel buon secolo della lingua (1887)

== Sources ==
- Amari, Michele (1896a), D'Ancona, Alessandro (ed.), Carteggio di Michele Amari, vol. 1, Torino: Roux
- Amari, Michele (1896b), D'Ancona, Alessandro (ed.), Carteggio di Michele Amari, vol. 2, Torino: Roux
- Amari, Michele (1907), D'Ancona, Alessandro (ed.), Carteggio di Michele Amari, vol. 3, Torino: Roux
- Derenbourg, Hartwig (1905), "Notice biographique sur Michele Amari (1806-1889)", Opuscules d'un Arabisant, 1868-1905, Paris: Charles Carrington, pp. 87–242
- Marcolongo, Bianca (1911), "Le idee politiche di M. Amari", Archivio Storico Siciliano, 36: 190–240 (reprinted in Studi amariani, ed. Andrea Borruso, Rosa D'Angelo and Rosa Scaglione Guccione, Palermo: Società Siciliana per la Storia Patria, 1991)
- Baldasseroni, Francesco (1914), "Michele Amari e Giovan Pietro Vieusseux (con Appendice di lettere inedite)", Archivio Storico Italiano, 72 (4): 245–346, JSTOR 44459942
- Mack Smith, Denis (1954), Cavour and Garibaldi, 1860: A Study in Political Conflict, Cambridge: Cambridge University Press
- Gabrieli, Francesco; Romeo, Rosario (1960), "Amari, Michele Benedetto Gaetano", Dizionario biografico degli italiani, vol. 2, Treccani
- Aquarone, Alberto (1960), "Amari, Emerico", Dizionario biografico degli italiani, vol. 2, Treccani
- Amari, Michele (1981), Diari e appunti autobiografici inediti, Naples: Edizioni Scientifiche Italiane
- Antonetti, Guy (1994), Louis-Philippe, Paris: Fayard
- Mack Smith, Denis (1997), Modern Italy: A Political History, New Haven, CT: Yale University
- Giuffrè, Fabrizio (2020), "60 ville da salvare: il caso di villa Amari", Salvare Palermo, 54/55: 15–18
