= Alessandro D'Ancona (professor) =

Italian literary critic, literary historian, and journalist (1835–1914)

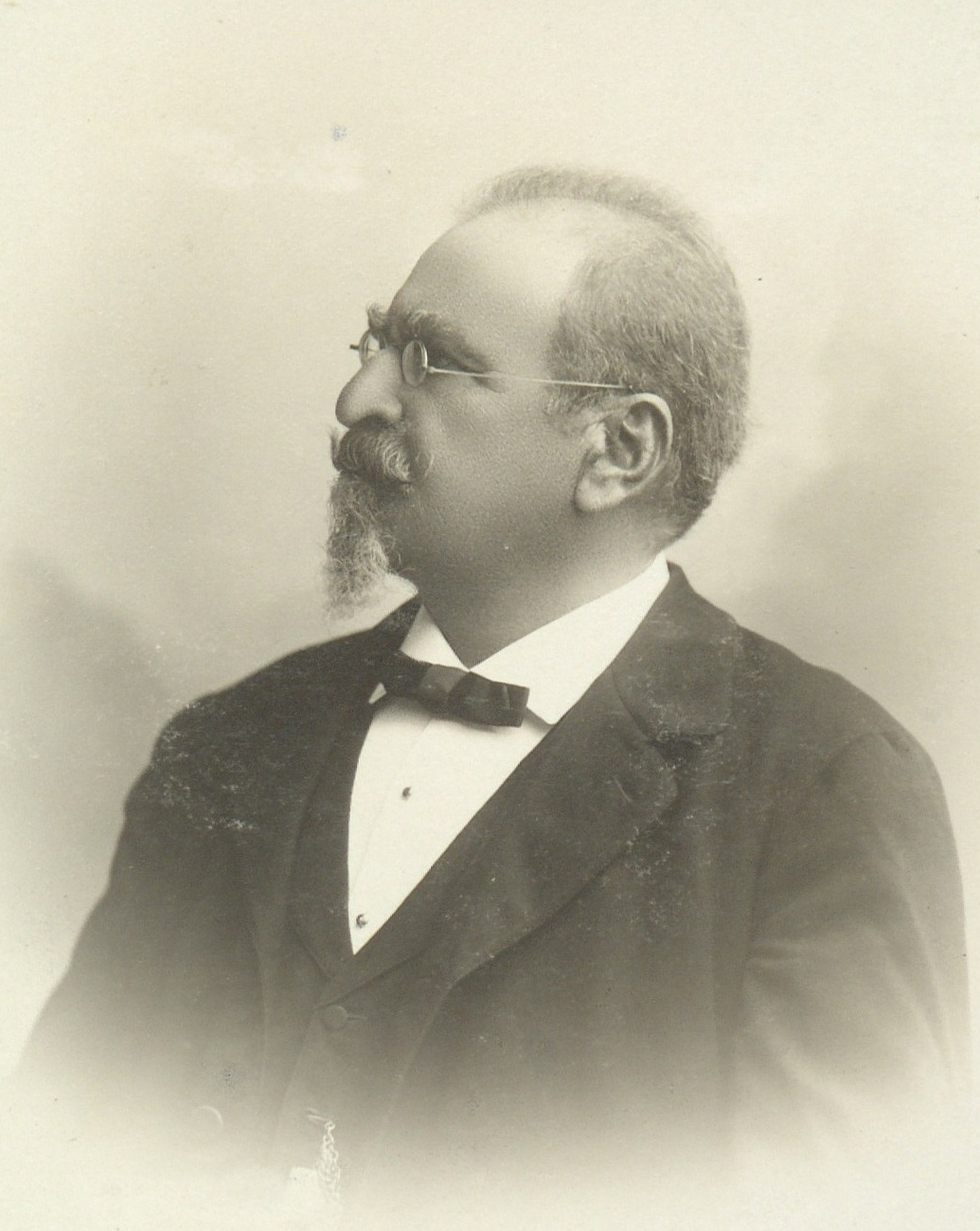
- Born: 20 February 1835; Pisa
- Died: 9 November 1914 (aged 79); Florence
- Occupations: Literary critic, literary historian, and journalist

Alessandro D'Ancona (20 February 1835 – 9 November 1914) was an Italian literary critic, literary historian, and journalist.

== Life ==
D'Ancona was born in Pisa, to a wealthy Jewish family, and educated at the University of Florence; at the age of 18, he published his essay on the life and work of the philosopher Tommaso Campanella.

In 1855, D'Ancona went to Turin, nominally to study law, but in reality to act as an intermediary between the Tuscan Liberals and Cavour; he was an intimate friend of Luigi Carlo Farini and represented Tuscany in the Società Nazionale. On the fall of the Austrian dynasty in Tuscany (27 April 1859), he returned to Florence, where he edited the newly founded newspaper La Nazione. In 1861 he was appointed professor of Italian literature at the University of Pisa.

In 1904 became a member of the Senate of the Kingdom of Italy.

He died in Florence.

== Works ==
Among his works, the following may be mentioned: Opera di Tommaso Campanella, 2 vols. (Turin, 1854); Sacre Rappresentazioni dei secoli XIV., XV., e XVI. (3 vols., Florence, 1872); Origini del Teatro in Italia (2 vols., Florence, 1877); La Poesia popolare italiana (Livorno, 1878), besides several volumes of literary essays, editions of the works of Dante and other early Italian writers, etc.
