= Gulf of 'Agig =

- Khalig ‘Agig (Arabic)
- Location in Sudan
- Coordinates: 18°20′N 38°10′E
- Ocean/sea sources: Red Sea
- Basin countries: Sudan
- Max. length: 13 km (8.1 mi)
- Max. width: 20 km (12 mi)
- Islands: Numerous

Ramsar Wetland
- Official name: Suakin-Gulf of Agig
- Designated: 2 February 2009
- Reference no.: 1860

Gulf of ‘Agig or Khalig ‘Agig, also spelled ʿAqīq or Akik, is a body of water on the coastline of Sudan on the Red Sea. It has been designated as a protected Ramsar site since 2009.

== Geography ==
The Gulf of ‘Agig is northeast-facing and is located 160 km to the southeast of Port Sudan. It has small islands on its eastern side, The ‘Amarāt Islands close to its mouth, and the smaller Hayyis Wa Karai Islands on its southwestern part, close to the shore.
