= Edward Stewart Kennedy =

American historian (1912-2009)

Edward S. Kennedy
- Born: January 3, 1912; San Ángel, Mexico City, Mexico
- Died: May 4, 2009 (aged 97); Doylestown, Pennsylvania, USA
- Citizenship: United States
- Education: Lafayette College, Lehigh University
- Spouse: Mary Helen Scanlon (m. 1951)
- Children: Anna Margaret Kennedy, Michael Kennedy-Scanlon, Nora Wallace Kennedy
- Awards: Order of al Istiqlal 2001

Edward Stewart Kennedy (3 January 1912 – 4 May 2009) was a historian of science specializing in medieval Islamic astronomical tables written in Persian and Arabic.

Edward S. Kennedy studied electrical engineering at Lafayette College, graduating in 1932. He then traveled to Iran to teach at Alborz College, at that time directed by the American Presbyterian Mission. In the Persian language environment, Kennedy made a study of Persian and became fluent in the language. After four years, he returned to Pennsylvania and took up study of series of exponential form related to Lambert series while at Lehigh University. He graduated Ph.D. in 1939.

When war broke out he enlisted with the US Army and was sent to Tehran to serve as an attaché, given his fluency in Persian. After the war, he saw Sarton and Neugebauer at Harvard as he had taken an interest in early Persian and Arabic science. Then he began to teach at the American University in Beirut (1946 to 1976). In 1951, he married Mary Helen Scanlon and together they had 3 children: Anna, Michael, and Nora. He participated at the American Research Center in Egypt until 1978 when he joined the Institute for the History of Arab Science at University of Aleppo. Edward and Mary-Helen left Lebanon in 1984.

Kennedy died in Doylestown, Pennsylvania at the age of 97.

== Publications ==
- Kennedy, Edward Stewart (1989) [1956]. A Survey of Islamic Astronomical Tables. American Philosophical Society. ISBN 978-0-87169-462-1.
- 1959: (with Mohammad Saffouri & Adnan Ifram), Al-Bīrūnī on Transits. Beirut: American University of Beirut, reprinted 1988: Frankfurt am Main: Institut für Geschichte der Arabisch-Islamischen Wissenschaften, Islamic Mathematics and Astronomy 33
- 1960: The Planetary Equatorium of Jamshīd Ghiyāth al-Dīn al-Kāshī (d. 1429). Princeton University Press
- 1968: "The Exact Sciences in Iran under the Saljuqs and Mongols," in Boyle, John Andrew, ed. (1968), The Cambridge history of Iran. 5: The Saljuq and Mongol periods / ed. by J. A. Boyle (7. print ed.), Cambridge: Cambridge Univ. Pr, ISBN 978-0-521-06936-6
- 1969: "The History of Trigonometry", chapter 6 of Historical Topics for the Mathematics Classroom, Washington DC: National Council of Teachers of Mathematics
- 1970: "The Arabic Heritage in the Exact Sciences," Al-Abhath 23: 327–344.
- 1971: Pingree, David; Kennedy, Edward S. (1971). The Astrological History of Masha'allah. Harvard Monographs in the History of Science. s.l: Harvard University Press. ISBN 978-0-674-86396-5.
- 1973: A Commentary upon Bīrunī's Kitaāb Taādīd [Nihāyāt] al-Amākin – An 11th century treatise on mathematical geography. Beirut: American University of Beirut Reprinted 1992: Frankfurt am Main: Institut für Geschichte der Arabisch-Islamischen Wissenschaften
- 1975: "The Exact Sciences during the Abbasid Period," in Frye, Richard Nelson, ed. (1975), The Cambridge history of Iran. 4: The period from the Arab invasion to the Saljuqs / ed. by R. N. Frye (6. print ed.), Cambridge: Cambridge Univ. Pr, ISBN 978-0-521-20093-6
- 1976: The Exhaustive Treatise on Shadows by Abu al-Rayḥān Muḥammad b. Aḥmad al-Bīrūnī, 2 volumes, University of Aleppo, Institute for the History of Arabic Science
- 1976: (edited with Imad Ghanem) The Life & Work of Ibn al-Shāṭir--An Arab Astronomer of the Fourteenth Century. Aleppo: University of Aleppo, Institute for the History of Arabic Science
- 1981: (translated with Fuad I. Haddad, commentary with David E. Pingree) The Book of the Reasons Behind Astronomical Tables (Kitāb fi 'ilal al-ziījāt) by 'Ali ibn Sulayman al-Hashimi. New York: Scholars' Facsimiles & Reprints, Delmar
- 1986: "The Exact Sciences in Timurid Iran," in Jackson, Peter, ed. (1986), The Cambridge history of Iran. 6: The Timurid and Safavid periods / ed. by Peter Jackson (6. print ed.), Cambridge: Cambridge Univ. Pr, ISBN 978-0-521-20094-3
- 1987: (with Mary Helen Kennedy) Geographical Coordinates of Localities from Islamic Sources. Frankfurt am Main: Institut für Geschichte der Arabisch-Islamischen Wissenschaften
- 1990: Studies in the Islamic Exact Sciences, Syracuse University Press ISBN 978-0815660675
- 1998: On the Contents and Significance of the Khāqānī Zīj by Jamshīd Ghiyāth al-Dīn al-Kāshī (Islamic Mathematics and Astronomy volume 84). Frankfurt am Main: Institut für Geschichte der Arabisch-Islamischen Wissenschaften
- 1998: Astronomy and Astrology in the Medieval Islamic World. Aldershot UK: Ashgate/Variorum
- 1999: (with Paul Kunitzsch and Richard P. Lorch) The Melon-Shaped Astrolabe in Arabic Astronomy. Stuttgart: Steiner.
- 2008: "Al-Bīrūnī (or Bērūnī), Abū Rayḥān (or Abu'l-Rayḥān) Muḥammad Ibn Aḥmad", Complete Dictionary of Scientific Biography, Encyclopedia.com, [1970–80]

== See also ==
- Islamic astronomy
- Science in the medieval Islamic world
- Otto Neugebauer
