= Francesco Gabrieli =

Italian Arabist (1904–1996)

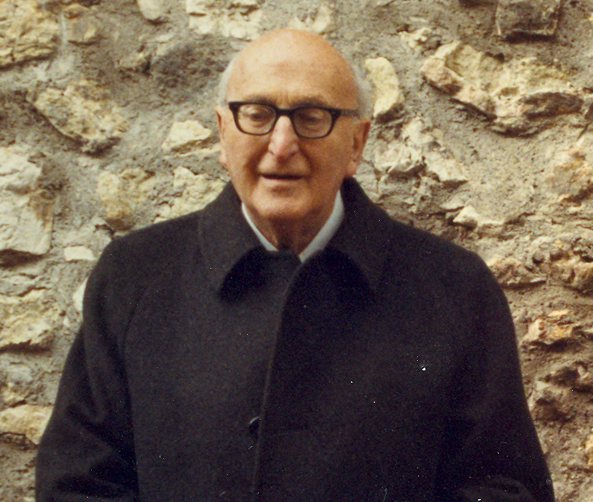
Francesco Gabrieli

Francesco Gabrieli (27 April 1904, in Rome – 13 December 1996, in Rome) was counted among the most distinguished Italian Arabists together with Giorgio Levi Della Vida and Alessandro Bausani, of whom he was respectively a student and colleague at the Sapienza Università di Roma (then simply the "Università di Roma").

== Life ==
Francesco Gabrieli was the son of Giuseppe Gabrieli, librarian to the Accademia dei Lincei. He learned Arabic with his father before studying classical Arabic literature at the University of Rome writing his degree thesis on the poet Al-Mutanabbi.

From 1928 to 1935 Gabrieli worked as an editor for Enciclopedia Italiana. From 1935 to 1938 he taught at the Naples Eastern University. In 1938 became professor of Arabic language and literature at the University of Rome, staying there until his retirement in 1979. He focused on Arabic studies. He died in Rome.

== Works ==
- Storia della letteratura araba, 1951
- (ed., tr.) Alfarabius compendium legum Platonis, 1952. Volume 3 of Plato Arabus, ed. Richard Walzer.
- (ed., tr.) Storici arabi delle Crociate, 1957. Translated by E. J Costello as Arab historians of the Crusades, 1957.
- Gli arabi, 1957. Translated by Salvator Attanasio as The Arabs: a compact handbook, 1963.
- (ed.) L'antica societá beduina, 1959.
- The Arab revival. Translated by Lovett F. Edwards, 1961.
- L'Islàm nella storia; saggi di storia e storiografia musulmana, 1966.
- Maometto e le grandi conquiste arabe, 1967. Translated by Virginia Luling and Rosamund Linell as Muhammad and the conquests of Islam, 1968.
