= Robert (disambiguation) =

Robert is a given name (the article includes a list of people and fictional characters with the name).

Robert may also refer to:

== People ==
- Robert (surname)

=== Religious figures ===
- Saint Robert of Molesme (1028–1111)
- Saint Robert of Newminster (c. 1100 – 1159)
- Brother Robert, 13th century translator of French works into Old Norse

=== Nobility and royalty ===
- Robert I (disambiguation)
- Robert II (disambiguation)
- Robert III (disambiguation)
- Robert, 1st Earl of Gloucester (c. 1090 – 1147), or Robert Rufus, Robert de Caen, Robert Consul
- Robert of Melun (1100–1167)
- Robert the Strong (c. 830 – 866)
  - The Robertians
- Prince Robert, Duke of Chartres (1840–1910)

=== Other people ===
- Robert, Indian film director, one half of the Robert–Rajasekar duo
- Robert (choreographer) (born 1981), Indian choreographer
- Robert Russell Bennett (1894–1981), American composer and arranger
- Robert Blake, (1933–2023), American actor
- Robert Ghanem (1942–2019), Lebanese lawyer and politician
- Robert Grierson (missionary), Canadian Presbyterian missionary
- Robert F. Kennedy (1925–1968), American lawyer and politician
- Robert De Niro (born 1943), American actor
- Robert S. Poston (born 1967), American cardiac surgeon
- Robert Redford (1936–2025), American actor

== Places ==
- Robert, California, U.S.
- Robert, Louisiana, U.S.
- Robert Island, South Shetland Islands, Antarctica
- Robert Island (Paracel Islands), in the South China Sea
- Robert Lake, in Québec, Canada
- Le Robert, Martinique; a town of France

== Other uses ==
- Robert (film), a 2015 British horror film
- Roberrt, a 2021 Indian Kannada-language action thriller film by Tharun Sudhir
- 240-Robert, an American TV series 1979–1981
- Robert (owarai), a Japanese comedy trio
- Robert (P2P software)
- Robert College, in Istanbul, Turkey
- Robert (doll), an allegedly haunted doll

== See also ==
- Roberts (disambiguation)
- Robertson (disambiguation)
- King Robert (disambiguation)
- Prince Robert (disambiguation)
- .257 Roberts, ammunition
- Robert le diable, an opera by Meyerbeer
- Dictionnaires Le Robert, a publisher of dictionaries founded by Paul Robert
  - Petit Robert, a French dictionary
