= Navy bands in Canada =

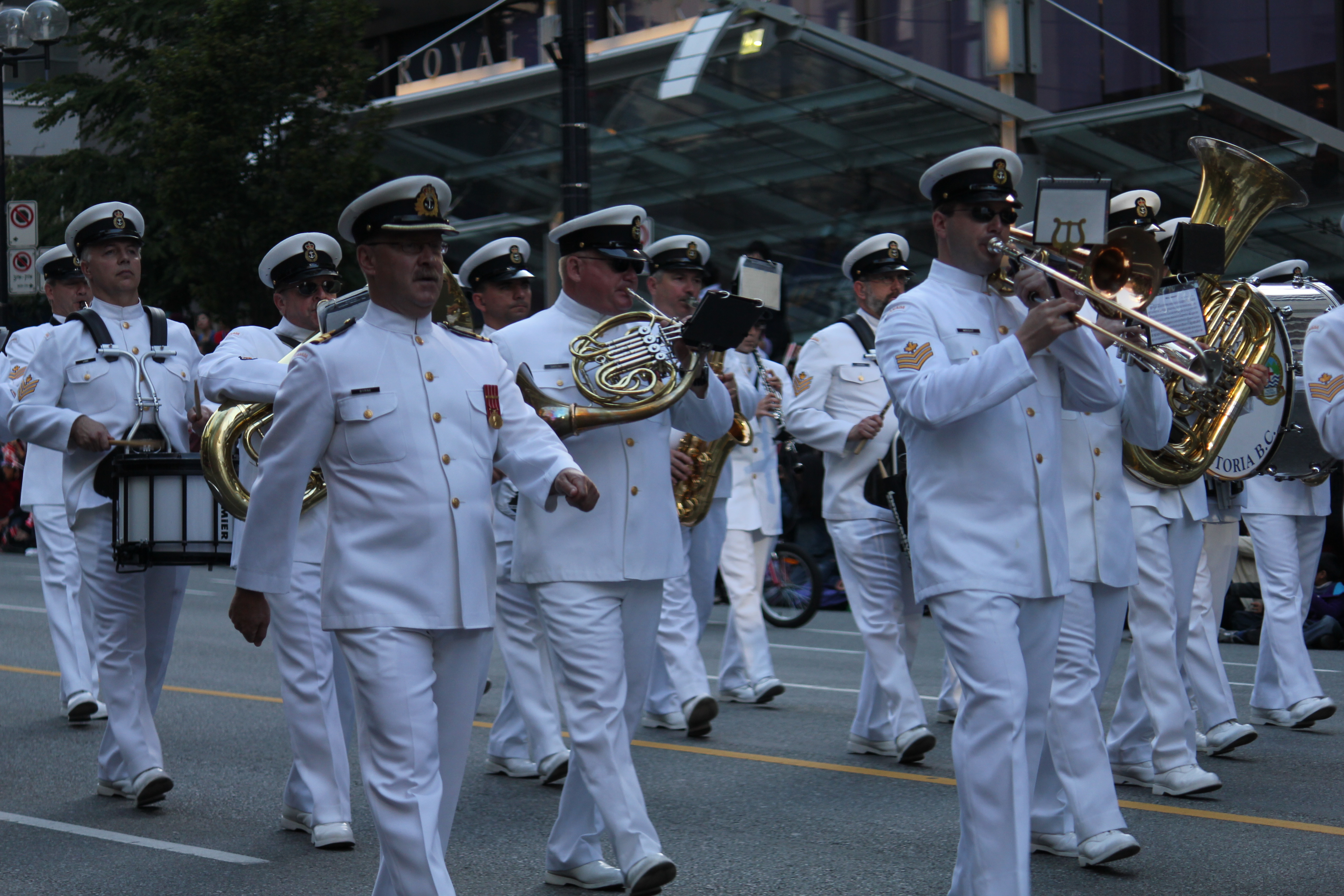
An RCN band during a Canada Day parade in Vancouver in 2011

Navy bands in Canada are part of the Royal Canadian Navy's command structure and overseen by the Music Branch of the Canadian Forces and the Directorate of History and Heritage of the Department of National Defence.

== History ==
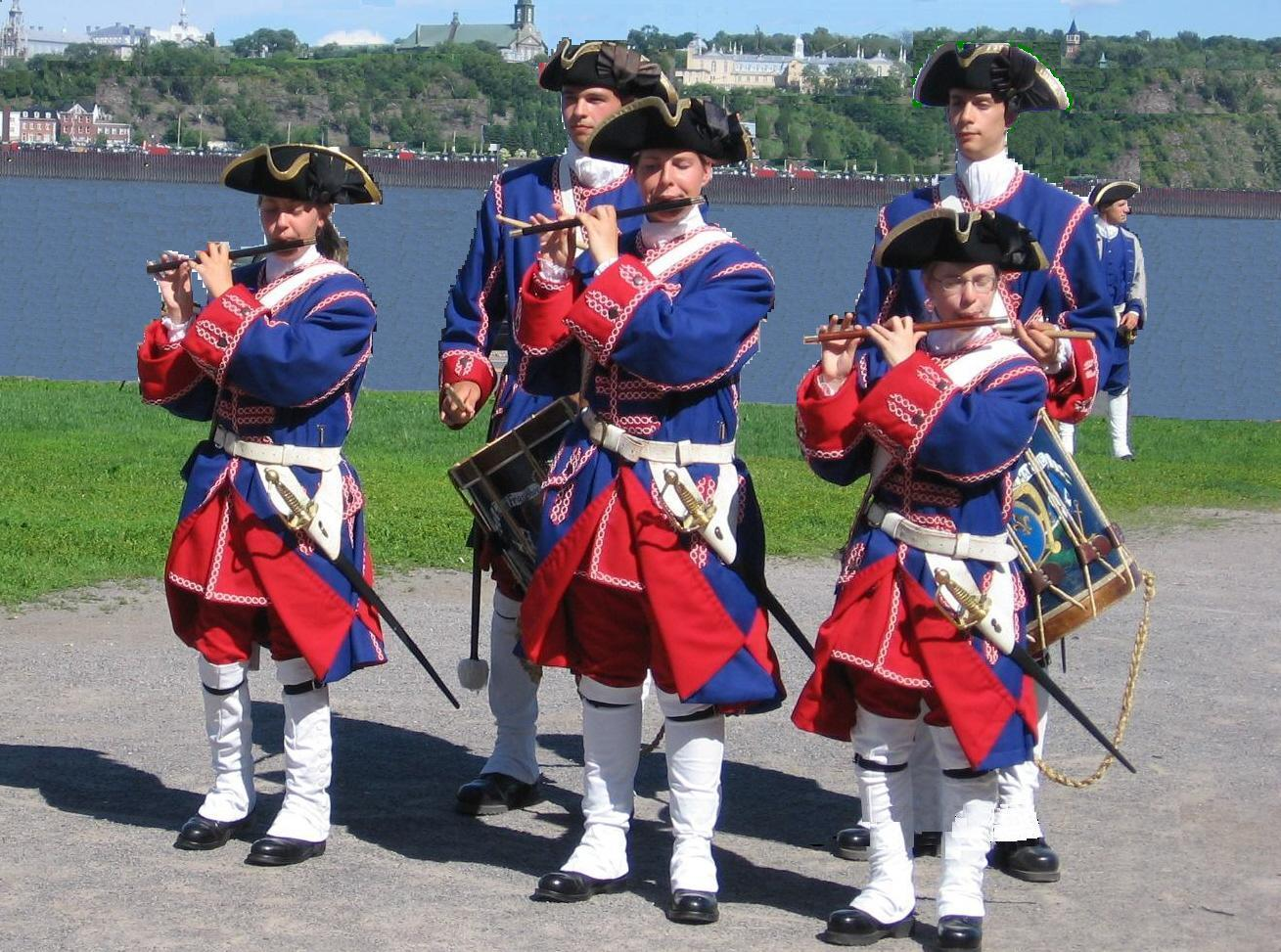
Reenactors depicting members of the Compagnies Franches de la Marine

=== Pre-Confederation ===
Navy music dates back to the era in which the Military of New France was the primary military force of the region. Musical units were primarily attached to the Compagnies Franches de la Marine and the Troupes de la marine, both of which were autonomous naval infantry units attached to the French Royal Navy. Each unit of the Compagnies Franches de la Marine contained two drums (tambour) and a fife (instrument). At the time, military bands in Canada (New France) were primarily based in the region that is now Quebec.

Due to its British heritage, naval music has long been part of the tradition of Canadian sailors and the sea. Prior to 1767, Royal Marines Divisional Bands operated in Chatham, Plymouth, Portsmouth, Deal, and Downs. Marine bands and their respective corps of drums provided music aboard ships before and during battles of the Napoleonic Wars, notably during actions in the Battle of Trafalgar. Halifax's history with naval music dates back to its establishment, with the cities ports supporting the garrison and fleet bands in the city.

=== 1867-1910 ===
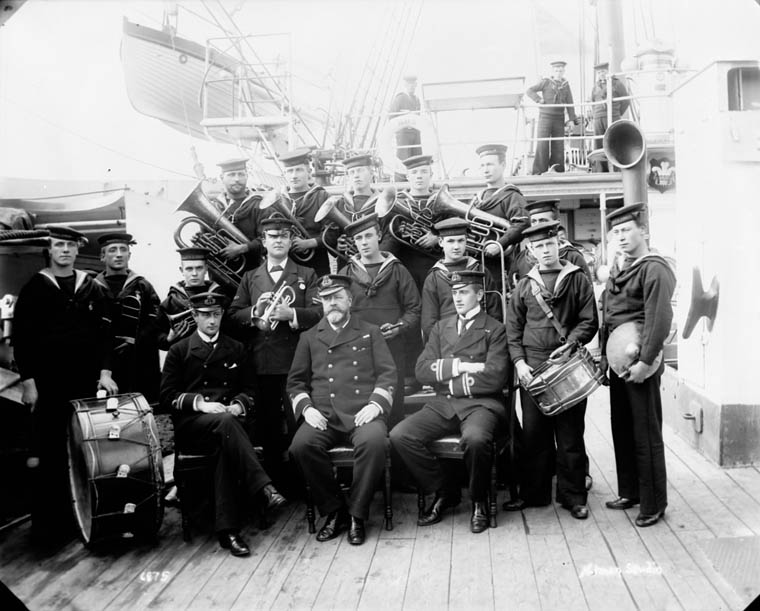
Members of the HMS Comus Band in Halifax in 1899

Following confederation in 1867, Naval protection began to be provided by the Royal Navy. This meant that all naval bands came from Britain and operated on a unit basis. Many musicians in these bands were recruited from the local area, although most came from Britain. After 1870, the presence of naval bands, particularly fleet bands, became insignificant in Western Canada and specifically in Victoria, British Columbia. As a result, few bands visited the area in the latter half of the century. Among the last British naval bands to go to Western Canada in the 19th century was the one from HMS Warspite (03) from 1890 to 1893 and from 1899 to 1902. In 1910, the House of Commons passed the Naval Service Act proposed by Prime Minister Wilfrid Laurier, establishing the Naval Service of Canada, the precursor to the RCN. As a result, part-time ship bands were formed in the new naval force of Canada.

=== Zealley era and the Second World War ===
Alfred Edward Zealley, a Naval officer who was considered to be the "father of the Royal Canadian Navy bands", hailed from Bristol and moved to Toronto in 1915 at the age of 37, becoming director of music of the RCN in the 1930s. The naval bands of that era rotated responsibilities in terms of playing at base, church and public parades through Esquimalt, Victoria and Vancouver.

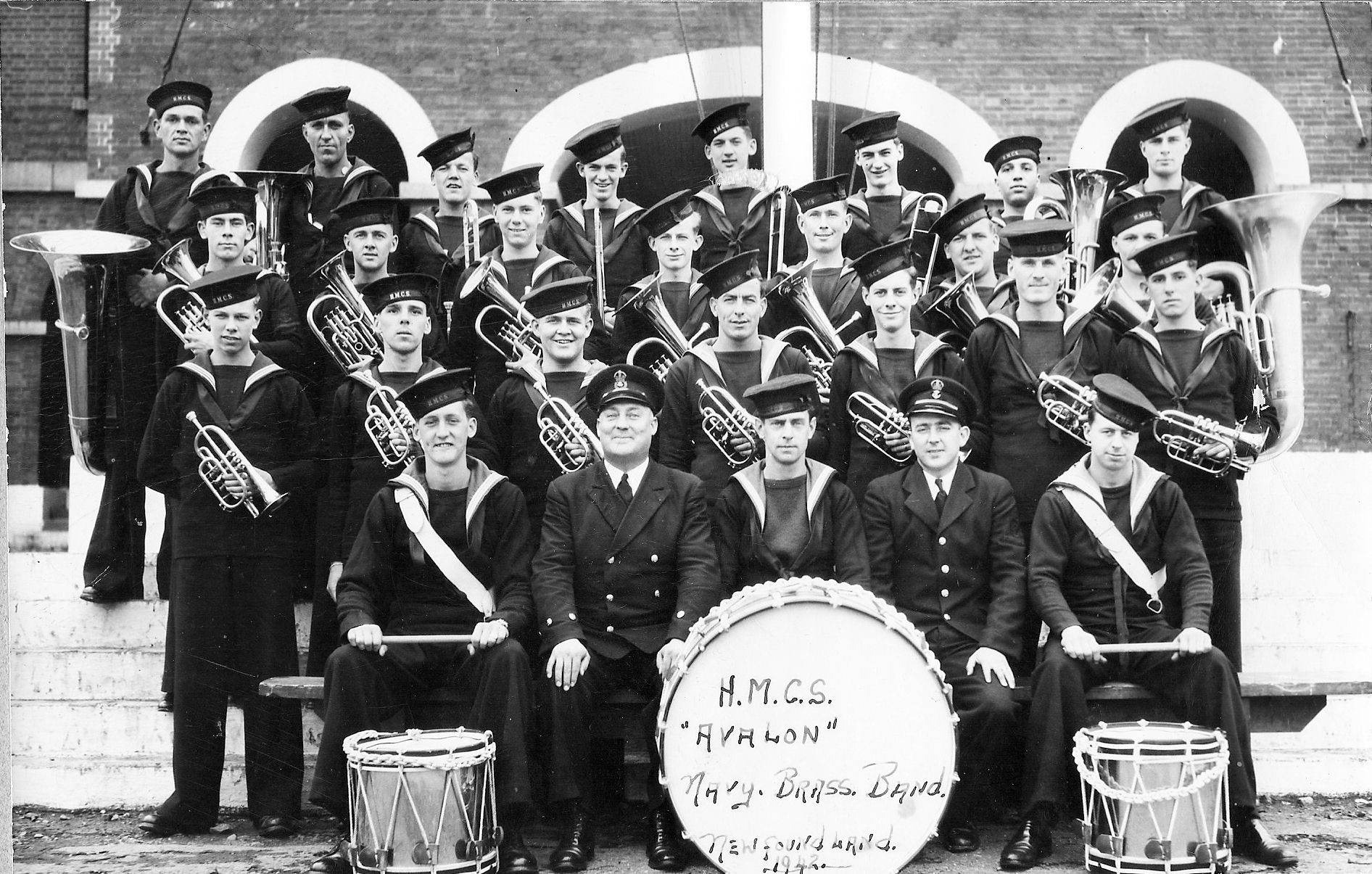
The HMCS Avalon Band in Newfoundland, 1942

In 1939, a permanent force navy band was recruited in Toronto under the direction of Lieutenant Zealley. It was organized when the Naval Service accepted an

offer to organize one at no cost to NSC. In 1943 he was promoted to the rank of Lieutenant Commander and appointed music director of the RCN School of Music in Toronto. He would lead supervise and train 19 navy bands throughout the war. During the war, three Royal Canadian Navy bands served aboard ships.

=== Post-war era and unification ===
Zealley retired in 1945 to Agincourt near Toronto, where he would die in May 1961. The Royal Canadian Navy School of Music was created in 1954 in Esquimalt, British Columbia for musicians of the RCN, with the school being the Canadian equivalent of the United States Armed Forces School of Music. In 1961, the school was expanded and rebranded to include musicians from the Canadian Army and the Royal Canadian Air Force and by the time of the Unification of the Canadian Armed Forces in February 1968, the school had officially been renamed to the Canadian Forces School of Music. Only the Stadacona Band and the Naden Band remained following unification. Until it was dissolved, the Band of HMCS Carleton served as the effective Central Band of the RCN as it was based in Ottawa, the national capital. In 1968, the Stadacona Band absorbed the Royal Canadian Artillery Band (Coastal) and members of the HMCS Cornwallis Band.

=== 21st Century ===
Since 2007, Naval musicians, along with musicians from the Canadian Army and Royal Canadian Air Force have manned the Band of the Ceremonial Guard in Ottawa, adopting the uniforms of the CG's two Foot Guard regiments, the Governor General's Foot Guards from Ottawa and the Canadian Grenadier Guards from Montreal. The CG recruits CF musicians on a part-time basis during the summer months. Many senior naval directors such as Lieutenant Catherine Norris have served in the CG.

== Characteristics ==
While most naval band members have some sort of part-time contract with the band, the RCN's two professional bands are composed of musicians with musical experience such as a music major. Naval bands perform ceremonial and marching music, including the national anthems of foreign countries and patriotic songs like The Maple Leaf Forever. Unlike the United Kingdom and more like United States military bands, Canada's navy, as well as other military services, sports Sousaphones in its bands. Due to a lack of a central band, many combined bands have performed when trying to represent the RCN as a whole. When two bands perform together, they are referred to as Combined Bands. When more than two bands are on parade, they are referred to as Massed Bands.

=== Uniform ===
These bands wear a mix of authorized military service dress; such as ceremonial dress, service dress, and operational dress. Full dress for members of the Royal Canadian Navy includes a navy blue tunic and trousers with white facings. Junior ratings wear sailor caps as it is custom while officers and senior ratings wear peaked caps.

=== Heart of Oak ===
Heart of Oak is the official march of the RCN. It derives from a song from the Garrick's Harlequin's Invasion of 1759. It was written and composed in commemoration of the victories of that year, namely Quiberon, Lagos and Quebec. It is also the official march of several Commonwealth navies, including the Royal Navy as well as the Royal New Zealand Navy and was also the official march of the Royal Australian Navy until the Royal Australian Navy replaced it in 1988.

=== Corps of Drums ===
In the Royal Canadian Navy, corps of drums have been historically attached to military bands at the front-rank following the precedent the bands of the Royal Navy and the Corps of Royal Marines. After the 1968 Unification of the Canadian Armed Forces, corps of drums in both the RCN were dismantled and abolished, although notably making a return in the mid-1980s within the naval reserve. In July 2013, a five-person corps of drums was unveiled for the first time by the Naden Band of Maritime Forces Pacific a Victoria Day Parade.

During the Second World War, many naval units maintained small corps of drums that were stationed at all major navy bases. While most of them were staffed by active duty sailors, others were volunteer bandsmen, who served as reservists and professional civilian percussionists.

=== Pipes and Drums ===
Like most other Commonwealth Realms, the RCN does not currently maintain any pipe and drum bands stemming from British tradition. The first RCN pipe band was established on 10 October 1954 at HMCS Cape Breton. In August 1955, the unit was authorized by Naval Headquarters as an official Navy Band. The band made its first appearance at the official opening of the Canso Causeway on the 13 August. Its second appearance took place days later on the 31st during the Navy Day parade. It was composed of new naval musicians and at its peak had 25 pipers and drummers in its ranks. In 1958, the Navy Department discontinued the band.

== Activities ==
Naval bands primarily participate in military parades, in concert, and play a role in solemn ceremonies such as military funerals and ceremonies such as the Ceremony of the Flags, and the Presentation of Colours. For reserve bands, they often participate in community as well as country's most revered commemorative naval events such as Remembrance Day parades and the Battle of the Atlantic anniversary. Navy bands perform at military tattoos within and outside Canada, festivals of military bands, and at civilian marching competitions. The first naval military tattoo took place in 1985 in honor of the RCN's 75th anniversary. In September 2010, the Royal Canadian Navy sponsored the Canadian Naval Centennial Tattoo in Pacific Coliseum in Vancouver celebrating the 100th anniversary of the RCN. As it celebrated a major milestone in the RCN, participation was high with naval bands. Among the foreign and non-RCN bands that performed were the Band of the Royal Marines, the Vancouver Police Pipe Band, and the Pipe Band of The Seaforth Highlanders of Canada. Three out of the 17 bands in the 1967 Canadian Armed Forces Tattoo came from the RCN. Navy bands have also played at every Halifax International Tattoo since the mid-1970s.

Since unification, its span of duties and range of activities have diversified. Performances on Parliament Hill for military parades and the Fortissimo Sunset Ceremony have taken place, as well as ceremonies at the nearby National War Memorial. Naval bands also have done at Grey Cup parades, for royal tours and state visits among other events. A four-piece combo from the Stadacona Band toured Norway, Sweden, and Denmark in 1981.

== Types ==
=== Professional ===
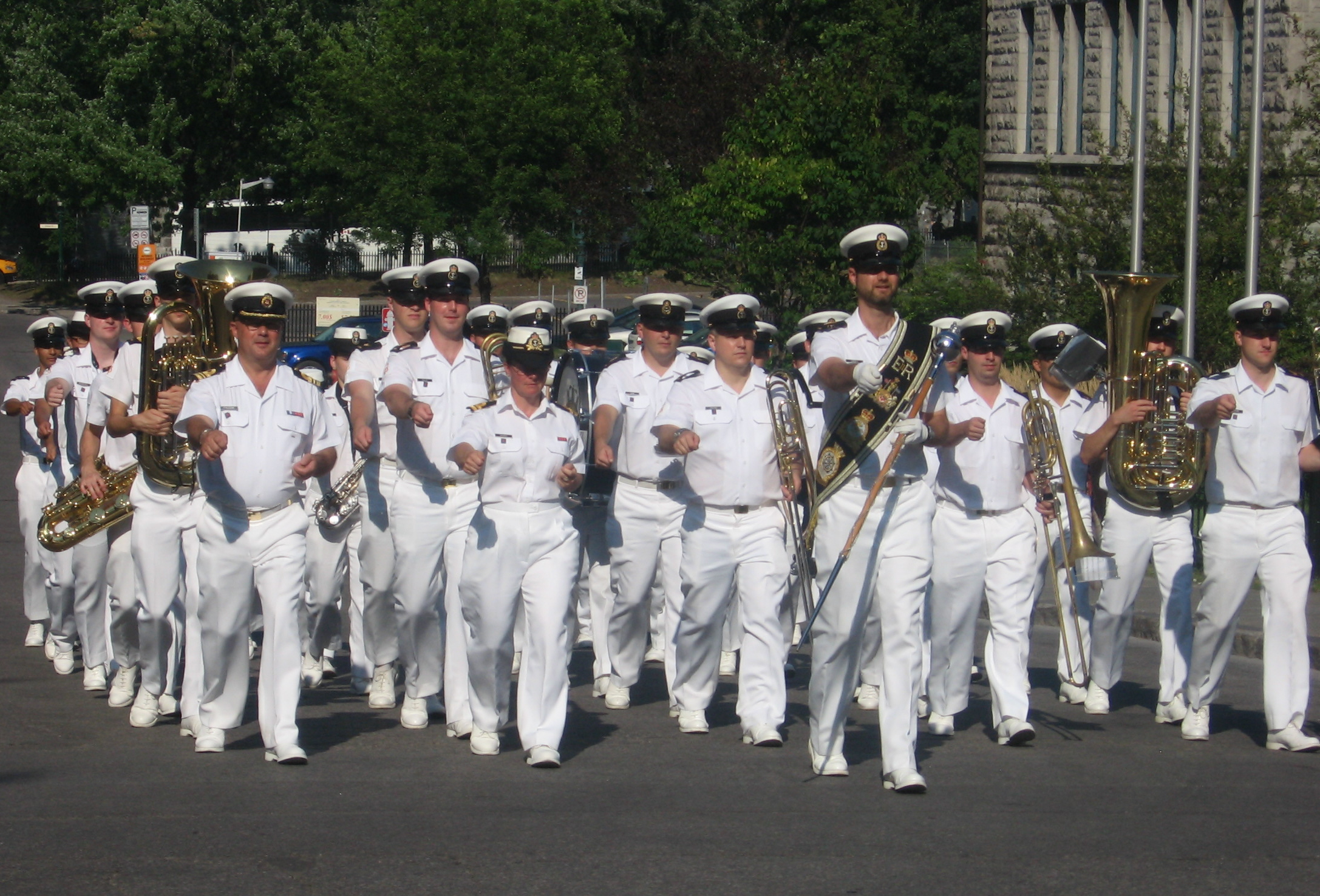
The Stadacona Band of the Royal Canadian Navy is one of six full-time professional bands in the Canadian Armed Forces.

The Royal Canadian Navy operates two full-time professional bands, one for each operational area of the Royal Canadian Navy, the Atlantic in the East and Pacific in the West. The Stadacona Band is based at CFB Halifax, and represents Maritime Forces Atlantic, whereas the Naden Band represents Maritime Forces Pacific, based at CFB Esquimalt. Both bands are brass and reed bands (bands consisting of brass instruments and woodwind instruments) and are part of the Regular Force.

=== Reserve ===
The Canadian Forces Naval Reserve maintains six military bands, that are also supported by a summertime band made up of musicians those six Naval Reserve bands that come together to form the National Band of the Naval Reserve, which spends the summer season performing throughout Canada.

The six active reserve bands in the Royal Canadian Navy include:

- HMCS Chippawa Band
- HMCS Donnacona Band
- HMCS Montcalm Band
- HMCS Star Band
- HMCS Tecumseh Band
- HMCS York Band

=== Sea Cadet Bands ===
One of the many activities that Canadian Cadet Organizations sponsors are music. The Royal Canadian Sea Cadets maintain different sized marching bands depending on the unit. Being voluntary bands, they are staffed by cadets from their respective units, typically being assisted by instructors in Canadian military bands of the Regular Force and Primary Reserve. The Sea Cadets support three types of marching bands: military bands, bugle bands, and pipe bands. As of 2002, there were 28 Sea Cadet bands in Ontario alone, with 16 of them being drum and bugle corps. Units larger than thirty people usually sport one of the three, or even will have lone instrument players such as a drum and bell (glockenspiel), a drum line or a lone piper. Pipe Band notably exist in Sea Cadets bands, although they are rare due to both the lack of a Naval tradition of piping, and the comparative expense of the instruments. The drum majors of these bands use different command styles from their counterparts in the RCN, particularly with commands such as countermarch and marktime. Bands often manage their own equipment during competitions and rehearsals.

The orders of for Sea Cadets Band normal dress are as follows:

- RCN Uniform (pre-1968)
- Shoulder flashes
- Seaman's cap
- Chains (may replace the lanyard if applicable)

The orders of for Sea Cadets Band highland dress are as follows:

- Glengarry Headdress
- Gunshirt
- Lanyard
- Tunic (cut-away to accommodate the sporran)
- Kilt Maple leaf tartan
- Boots
- Hosetops
- Flashes, garter
- Spats
- White belt
- Sgian Dubh
- Sporran, hair
- Kilt Pin
- Medals
- Pins

Summer Training offered to musicians consists of 3- and 6-week courses. Training is given based on the standards of The Royal Conservatory of Music. Since 1983, HMCS Ontario has Canada's only cadet music camp for drum and bugle musicians, providing formal training for those who play in drum and bugle bands in their home units. SCSTC HMCS Avalon, located in St. John's, Newfoundland, was at its closing, the smallest SCSTC in Canada, offering training only in beginner band and another activity.

=== Former bands ===
- HMCS Avalon Band
- HMCS Brunswicker Band
- HMCS Carleton Band
- HMCS Cornwallis Band
- HMCS Quadra Band
- HMCS Quebec Band
- HMCS Discovery Band
- HMCS Hunter Band
- HMCS Malahat Band
- HMCS Niobe Band (nicknamed the "Stokers Band")
- HMCS Shearwater Band
- HMCS Shelburne Band
- HMCS Stadacona Band
- HMCS Uganda Band
- HMCS Unicorn Band

Most were cut in the early 1940s and 1990s.

=== Other bands ===
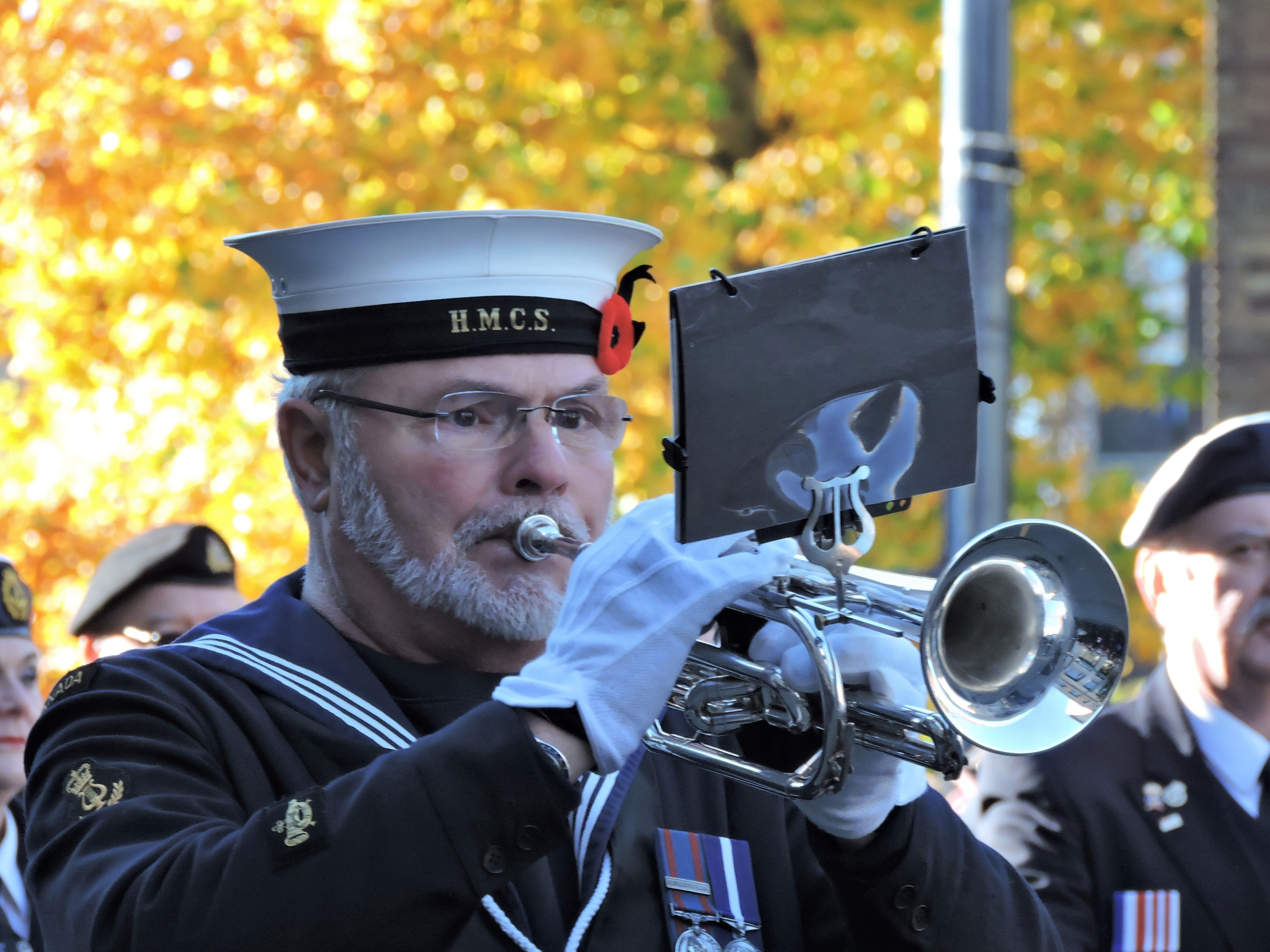
A member of the Vancouver Naval Veterans Band during a parade in Vancouver in 2014

Many navy based bands are formed outside the auspices of the armed forces. Some of these include the Vancouver Naval Veterans Band, which recruits from the area military and merchant navy population as well as civilians. Founded: 1996, by naval veterans of the Second World War.

== See also ==
- Navy Music Program
- Canadian military bands
- National Band of the Naval Reserve
- United States Navy Band
- List of Royal Canadian Air Force Bands
