= Roberts (surname) =

- Language: Welsh, English

Origin
- Meaning: "Robert's son", "bright renown"
- Region of origin: Wales, England

Roberts is a surname of English and Welsh origin, deriving from the given name Robert, meaning "bright renown" – from the Germanic elements "hrod" meaning renown and "beraht" meaning bright. The surname, meaning "son of Robert", is common in North Wales and elsewhere in the United Kingdom.

== Fictional characters ==
- Alf Roberts, Audrey Roberts and Renee Roberts, from British soap opera Coronation Street
- Barbara Millicent Roberts, doll known as Barbie
- Chelsea Roberts (formerly known as Kelly Roberts), sister to Barbie
- Dread Pirate Roberts, a character in The Princess Bride
- Irene Roberts, from Australian soap opera Home and Away
- Moose Roberts, supporting character in Fireman Sam
- Renée Roberts, English dubbed name for Zakuro Fujiwara in Tokyo Mew Mew
- Skipper Roberts, doll known as Skipper
- Stacie Roberts, sister to Barbie
- Summer Roberts, from American television series The O.C.
- Tutti and Todd Roberts, dolls known as Tutti and Todd

== See also ==
- Robert (surname)
- Robertson (disambiguation)
- Roberts (disambiguation)
- Robarts (disambiguation)
- Robards
