= HMCS Carleton Band =

Military band

The HMCS Carleton Band from Ottawa was a military band in the Royal Canadian Navy. and the Canadian Forces. It was founded by Gerald Heatley sometime after the Second World War. It was dubbed the "Pride of the Navy" due to its connection to the national capital and often performed at public events throughout in Ontario and Quebec during the 1950s. It was also the biggest military band in the capital, consisting of 48 members who were organized 8 members deep and 6 across. It often took part in the national commemorative events in honor of the Battle of the Atlantic and Remembrance Day. This effectively made it the Central Band of the RCN. It often provided instruction to the cadets at RCSCS Falkland.

The band has won many awards in its history. In 1960, the band won the Carling Trophy and in June 1963, the band under the direction of Petty Officer Hank LeClair, won the L. L. Coulter Trophy at the Central Canada Exhibition in Ottawa. On 31 August 1967, the band performed during the first "Ceremony of the Flags" on Parliament Hill. That same year a big band was created within the band's ranks.

Chris Daly, who was a member of the band in the 60s as well as was a member of the Governor General's Foot Guards Bugle Band, was a founding member of the Swampwater Jazz Band. Dutch-born Lieutenant Henry Bonnenberg also served as the director of music in the 1950s while concurrently serving as director of music at Laurentian High School. During his term as director of music, Bonnenberg was assisted by Drum Major John Renaud, former Salvation Army Brass Band member C. Linklater and former member of the Guards Band L. Tanner.

The band was dissolved in 1993 as a result of the federal budget that was presented by Finance Minister Don Mazankowski in the House of Commons.

== See also ==
- United States Navy Band
- National Band of the Naval Reserve
- Naden Band of Maritime Forces Pacific
- Stadacona Band of Maritime Forces Atlantic
- Navy bands in Canada
