= Roberts =

Roberts may refer to:

== People ==
- Roberts (given name), a Latvian masculine given name
- Roberts (surname), a surname

== Places ==
- Roberts (crater), a lunar impact crater on the far side of the Moon

United States

- Roberts, Idaho
- Roberts, Illinois
- Roberts, Indiana
- Roberts, West Virginia
- Roberts, Wisconsin
- Roberts County, South Dakota
- Roberts County, Texas
- Mount Roberts (New Hampshire), a summit in the Ossipee Mountains

=== Facilities and structures ===
- The old name of Brandeis/Roberts (MBTA station)
- Roberts Stadium (disambiguation)

== Other uses ==
- Roberts (agriculture company)
- Roberts class monitor, a class of British warship
- USS Samuel B. Roberts (FFG-58), a U.S. Navy frigate
- Roberts Cycles, a cycle manufacturer (also known as Chas. Roberts)
- Roberts Radio, a radio manufacturer
- .257 Roberts, a medium-powered .25 caliber cartridge
- Roberts (syrup company), a Swedish soft drinks manufacturer

== See also ==
- Strebor, a lock manufacturer (Roberts spelled backwards)
- Trebor (disambiguation)
- Robertson (disambiguation)
- Robert (disambiguation)
- Robarts (disambiguation)
- Les Roberts (disambiguation)
