= Beating retreat (India) =

Military ceremony

Beating Retreat Ceremony (India)
- A performance by the combined military bands during the Beating Retreat Ceremony (2022).
- Genre: Military ceremony
- Date: Annually on 29 January
- Frequency: Annual from 1955
- Locations: Vijay Chowk, Kartavya Path, New Delhi, India
- Coordinates: 28°36′50″N 77°13′20″E
- Participants: Indian Armed Forces Assam Rifles; Border Security Force; Central Industrial Security Force; Central Reserve Police Force; Indo-Tibetan Border Police; Sashastra Seema Bal Delhi Police and combined military bands

- Patron: President of India
- Website: rashtraparv.mod.gov.in

Beating retreat is an annual military ceremony in India, held every year on 29 January at Vijay Chowk, New Delhi, marking the formal conclusion of the Republic Day celebrations. The ceremony is organised by the Ministry of Defence and presided over by the President of India, who is the Supreme Commander of the Indian Armed Forces. During the ceremony, combined military bands of the Indian Army, Indian Navy, Indian Air Force, Assam Rifles, Central Armed Police Forces and Delhi Police perform traditional and contemporary military tunes.

The tradition of the ceremony evolved from British military customs, whose original purpose was to signal soldiers at sunset to cease fighting and return to their camps. In India, it was first held in 1955, when Major Roberts of the then Indian Army proposed making it the concluding event of the Indian Republic Day celebrations. Over time, the ceremony has become a symbol of India's military traditions, discipline, cultural heritage and national pride. At the conclusion of the ceremony, Saare Jahan Se Achha and other military tunes are played, and the formal conclusion of the Republic Day celebrations takes place with the departure of the President.

== History ==
The Beating Retreat Ceremony originated from a 17th-century European military tradition, in which bugles and drums were played at sunset after battles or patrols to signal soldiers to withdraw from the battlefield and return to their camps. This signal was known as Beating Retreat. The tradition was later adopted by the British Army and, after independence, was incorporated into the formal military traditions of the Indian Army.

The present form of the Beating Retreat Ceremony in India developed during the 1950s. It was conceived by Major G. A. Roberts, an officer of the Grenadiers Regiment, on the instructions of then Prime Minister Jawaharlal Nehru. The objective was to organise a grand military ceremony on the occasion of the first state visit to independent India by Elizabeth II and Prince Philip, Duke of Edinburgh. Subsequently, the ceremony was established as the formal conclusion of the annual Republic Day celebrations held on 29 January.

Over time, the ceremony expanded to include bands from the Indian Army, Indian Navy and Indian Air Force, along with bands from the Delhi Police and the Central Armed Police Forces. Since 2016, bands from the Central Armed Police Forces and Delhi Police have also regularly participated in the ceremony.

== Ceremony ==
The combined military band performing at Vijay Chowk during the Beating Retreat Ceremony (2018).

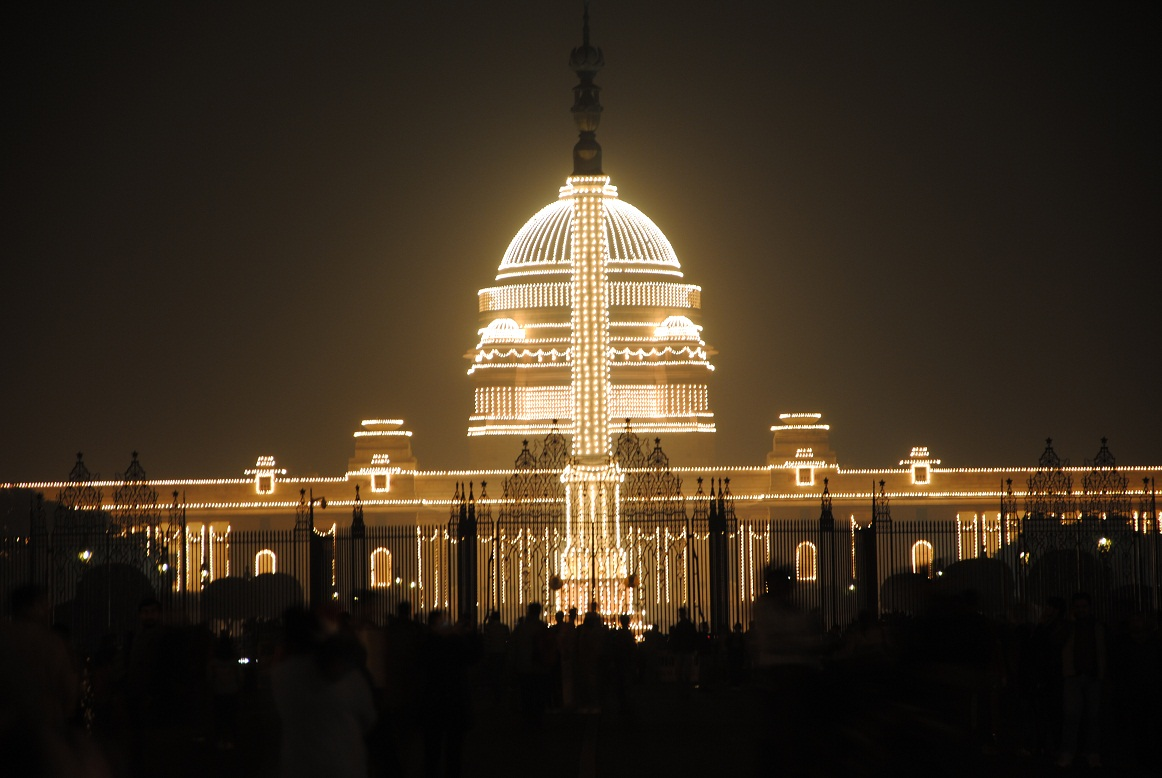
Rashtrapati Bhavan illuminated at night.

The Beating Retreat Ceremony is held annually on the evening of 29 January at Vijay Chowk, New Delhi. It is regarded as the formal conclusion of the Republic Day celebrations and is organised by the Ministry of Defence. The ceremony is presided over by the President of India, who is the Supreme Commander of the Indian Armed Forces.

The ceremony begins with the arrival of the President and a national salute. This is followed by the combined military bands of the Indian Army, Indian Navy and Indian Air Force, which march in formation and perform various military and traditional tunes. During the latter part of the ceremony, pipe and drum bands give special performances, after which the national flag is ceremonially lowered at sunset to the sound of a bugle call. Finally, Saare Jahan Se Achha and other traditional tunes are played, and the ceremony concludes with the departure of the President.

== Military participation ==
The Beating Retreat Ceremony is regarded as a symbol of the military traditions, discipline and coordination of the Indian Armed Forces. The combined military bands of the Indian Army, Indian Navy and Indian Air Force play a prominent role in the ceremony. The bands of the three services enter Vijay Chowk in a prescribed military sequence and perform various Indian and traditional military tunes. Pipe and drum bands, brass bands and buglers play an important role in maintaining the formality and dignity of the ceremony.

During the ceremony, the bands perform coordinated marches, display military formations and present musical performances in a prescribed sequence. At sunset, a bugle call is played, accompanied by the ceremonial lowering of the national flag. This is followed by the combined bands performing the concluding tunes, after which the ceremony formally concludes with the President's approval.

Since 2016, the scope of the ceremony has expanded with the regular inclusion of bands from the Delhi Police and the Central Armed Police Forces. At present, bands from the Assam Rifles, Border Security Force, Central Reserve Police Force, Central Industrial Security Force, Indo-Tibetan Border Police, Sashastra Seema Bal and Delhi Police participate jointly with the three armed services. The collective performances of these bands are regarded as a symbol of Indian military traditions, national unity and coordination among various security forces.

== Role of the President ==
The Beating Retreat Ceremony is presided over by the President of India, who is the Supreme Commander of the Indian Armed Forces. The President arrives at Vijay Chowk as the chief guest, formally escorted by the mounted contingent of the President's Bodyguard. Upon the President's arrival, the President's Bodyguard presents a national salute, accompanied by the combined military bands playing the national anthem and the national flag being ceremonially hoisted.

The President, Smt. Droupadi Murmu, PM and Union Minister for Defence, Shri Rajnath Singh at the ‘Beating Retreat’ ceremony, at Vijay Chowk, on January 29, 2023.

During the ceremony, the President witnesses performances by the military bands, pipe and drum bands, bugle calls and other formal proceedings. At sunset, the national flag is ceremonially lowered to the sound of a bugle call. Thereafter, the bandmaster appears before the President and formally seeks permission to lead the combined bands away. Following the President's approval, the combined military bands depart from the venue while performing Saare Jahan Se Achha and other military tunes.

At the conclusion of the ceremony, the President's Bodyguard presents a final national salute, after which the President formally departs from the venue. The President's departure marks the official conclusion of the Republic Day celebrations.

== Relationship with Republic Day celebrations ==
The Beating Retreat Ceremony is the official and formal concluding event of India's Republic Day celebrations. While the Republic Day Parade, held on Kartavya Path on 26 January, showcases India's military strength, cultural diversity and national achievements, the Beating Retreat Ceremony, held on 29 January, marks the conclusion of these celebrations. Thus, the Beating Retreat Ceremony is the final event in the series of Republic Day celebrations extending from 26 to 29 January.

The ceremony is held at Vijay Chowk, between Rashtrapati Bhavan, North Block and South Block. On this occasion, combined military bands of the three armed services and other security forces perform traditional and contemporary military tunes. At sunset, the national flag is ceremonially lowered to the sound of a bugle call, after which the bands depart from the venue with the President's permission. This tradition is regarded as a symbol of military discipline, honour and dedication to the nation.

Since 2022, greater emphasis has been placed on India's cultural heritage during the ceremony, with military and patriotic compositions by Indian musicians being included in place of several colonial-era tunes. In addition, special illumination of Rashtrapati Bhavan, North Block and South Block, along with modern lighting and sound effects, has made the ceremony more visually appealing.

== Light and sound displays ==
A view of the illuminated Rashtrapati Bhavan, North Block and South Block during the Beating Retreat Ceremony 2022.

A view of the illuminated Rashtrapati Bhavan, North Block and South Block during the Beating Retreat Ceremony.

A major attraction of the Beating Retreat Ceremony is its grand light and sound display, which specially illuminates Vijay Chowk and the surrounding area. At sunset, when the ceremony reaches its culmination, the historic buildings of Rashtrapati Bhavan, North Block and South Block are illuminated with colourful lighting arrangements. This spectacle provides not only a sense of ceremonial formality but also the atmosphere of a cultural celebration.

Rashtrapati Bhavan, North Block and South Block illuminated with decorative lighting on the occasion of the Beating Retreat Ceremony 2022.

During the ceremony, lighting effects are synchronised with the music performed by the military bands, creating an audiovisual experience. The use of modern technology has also introduced laser shows and contemporary lighting arrangements, making this traditional military ceremony more visually appealing and spectacular.

Over the years, the light and sound presentation at the ceremony has been continuously enhanced. It incorporates lighting effects synchronised with Indian classical and patriotic music, transforming the conclusion of the ceremony into a grand and memorable cultural experience.

== Relationship with Republic Day celebrations ==
The Beating Retreat Ceremony is the formal and symbolic concluding event of the Republic Day celebrations. It is held annually on 29 January and is regarded as the final stage of the three-day Republic Day festivities (26 to 29 January). The event takes place near Vijay Chowk in the capital city of New Delhi, where the combined bands of the three armed services give musical performances.

== Major changes ==
Several significant changes have been introduced to the Beating Retreat Ceremony over time, with the aim of giving it a more Indian, cultural and modern character. In the past, the ceremony was influenced by numerous Western military tunes and colonial traditions. However, in recent years, greater priority has been given to Indian music and indigenous compositions. This has strengthened the ceremony's cultural identity and national character.

=== Changes since 2022 ===
Since 2022, extensive changes have been introduced to the ceremony, including the replacement of colonial-era tunes with compositions created by Indian musicians. In addition, the light and sound presentation has been made more modern and visually appealing, contributing to the development of the event as a cultural celebration as well.

=== Inclusion of indigenous tunes ===
Indian military bands now give prominence to compositions created by Indian military musicians and based on Indian musical traditions. This change was introduced with the aim of promoting India's cultural heritage and giving the ceremony a stronger national identity.

=== Illumination of Vijay Chowk ===
The decorative lighting and laser shows organised in the Vijay Chowk area have also become more elaborate over time. The buildings of Rashtrapati Bhavan, North Block and South Block are adorned with special lighting arrangements, transforming the ceremony into an audiovisual experience.

== Notable editions ==
Various editions of the Beating Retreat Ceremony have witnessed significant changes and the introduction of special attractions over time. In recent years, the ceremony has evolved not only as a military tradition but also as a cultural and national celebration. Various innovations have been introduced in its musical performances, lighting arrangements and military band presentations over the years.

== Notable editions ==
Various editions of the Beating Retreat ceremony have witnessed significant changes and the introduction of special attractions over time. In recent years, the ceremony has evolved not only as a military tradition but also as a cultural and national celebration. Several innovations in music, lighting arrangements and performances by military bands have been introduced in different years.

=== 74th Beating Retreat ceremony (2022) ===
The 2022 Beating Retreat ceremony was historic and transformative in several respects. It was organised as part of Azadi Ka Amrit Mahotsav to commemorate 75 years of India's independence. For the first time, an indigenous drone show, projection mapping and a special emphasis on Indian musical compositions were introduced, giving the ceremony a unique blend of traditional military heritage and modern technology.

The main attraction of the ceremony was a light display featuring approximately 1,000 indigenous drones, which was included in the Beating Retreat ceremony for the first time. The approximately ten-minute-long performance was developed, designed and choreographed by Botlab Dynamics under the Make in India initiative. The project received support from the Indian Institute of Technology Delhi (IIT Delhi) and the Department of Science and Technology. Accompanied by synchronised music, the drone show depicted India's cultural heritage, its journey through 75 years of independence and national achievements through aerial formations.

The ceremony featured a total of 26 performances, with combined bands from the Indian Army, Indian Navy, Indian Air Force and the Central Armed Police Forces (CAPF) giving prominence to Indian military music. The programme began with the combined band performing the tune 'Veer Sainik', followed by performances by the Pipes and Drums Band, CAPF Band, Air Force Band, Navy Band and Army military bands in succession. The Principal Conductor of the ceremony was Commander Vijay Charles D'Cruz.

Several new Indian compositions were included in the programme that year, with Kerala, Hind Ki Sena and Ae Mere Watan Ke Logon among the notable additions. In the same year, the Christian hymn Abide With Me, which had been a regular part of the ceremony since 1950, was removed and replaced with the tune of the patriotic song Ae Mere Watan Ke Logon by poet Pradeep. The change was intended to give greater prominence to Indian-origin compositions and reflect the spirit of Azadi Ka Amrit Mahotsav. The ceremony traditionally concluded with the tune Sare Jahan Se Achha.

For the first time, a projection mapping show lasting approximately three to four minutes was also presented on the historic buildings of North Block and South Block. The audiovisual presentation used lighting and digital technology to showcase the achievements of independent India and its national heritage. In addition, following the COVID-19 pandemic, the invitation cards for the ceremony were prepared using eco-friendly paper containing seeds of medicinal plants, with environmental conservation in mind.

The 2022 edition was particularly noteworthy because several traditional tunes from the colonial era were replaced by compositions written by Indian musicians. This change gave the ceremony a more distinctly Indian identity and was regarded as an expression of cultural revival.

=== 75th Beating Retreat ceremony (2023) ===
Prime Minister of Bharat, Shri Narendra Modi at the ‘'Beating Retreat'’ ceremony at Vijay Chowk on January 29, 2023..

The 75th Beating Retreat ceremony was held on 29 January 2023 at Vijay Chowk, New Delhi, in the presence of President of India Droupadi Murmu. The ceremony marked the formal conclusion of the 74th Republic Day celebrations. Prime Minister of India Narendra Modi, Defence Minister Rajnath Singh and other dignitaries were also present.

The most prominent feature of the 2023 ceremony was the extensive inclusion of military compositions based on Indian classical ragas. Combined bands from the Indian Army, Indian Navy, Indian Air Force, state police forces and the Central Armed Police Forces (CAPF) performed a total of 29 Indian compositions. The ceremony began with the Massed Band performing Agniveer, followed by the Pipes and Drums Band, which presented tunes such as Almora, Kedarnath, Sangam Door, Queen of Satpura, Bhagirathi and Konkan Sundari.

The Indian Air Force Band performed Aparajeya Arjun, Charkha, Vayu Shakti and Swadeshi, while the Indian Navy Band presented Ekla Chalo Re, Hum Tayyar Hain and Jai Bharati. The Indian Army's military band performed popular military and patriotic compositions, including Shankhnaad, Sher-e-Jawan, Bhupal, Agrani Bharat, Young India, Kadam Kadam Badhaye Ja, Drummers Call and Ae Mere Watan Ke Logon. The ceremony concluded with the traditional tune Sare Jahan Se Achha.

The ceremony featured India's largest indigenous drone show at the time, in which approximately 3,500 indigenous drones flew in synchronised formations above Raisina Hills, creating images of national leaders, historical events, cultural symbols and various national motifs. The performance was organised to showcase the Indian start-up ecosystem, the technological capabilities of young people and the country's indigenous innovation capabilities. The drone show was conducted by Botlab Dynamics.

The 2023 ceremony was also technologically significant because 3D anamorphic projection mapping was displayed for the first time on the facades of North Block and South Block. This special audiovisual presentation used modern lighting and projection technology to showcase India's cultural heritage, scientific achievements, national development and journey since independence.

The Principal Conductor of the ceremony was Flight Lieutenant Leimapokpam Rupachandra Singh. The Indian Army Band was led by Subedar Major Diggar Singh, the Indian Navy Band by M. Anthony Raj, and the Indian Air Force Band by Warrant Officer Ashok Kumar. The State Police and Central Armed Police Forces Band was conducted by Assistant Sub-Inspector Prem Singh. The buglers were led by Naib Subedar Santosh Kumar Pandey, while the Pipes and Drums Band was led by Subedar Major Basavaraj Wagge.

According to the Ministry of Defence, the ceremony symbolises a historical military practice in which bugle calls were sounded at sunset to signal the end of fighting and the return of soldiers to their camps. During the Beating Retreat ceremony, flags and military colours and standards are ceremonially lowered, making the event a symbol of the country's military heritage, discipline and pride.

=== 76th Beating Retreat ceremony (2024) ===
The 76th Beating Retreat ceremony was held on 29 January 2024 at Vijay Chowk, New Delhi. It marked the formal conclusion of the 75th Republic Day celebrations. The historic military ceremony, held at sunset, was presided over by President of India and Supreme Commander of the Armed Forces Droupadi Murmu. Vice President of India Jagdeep Dhankhar, Prime Minister of India Narendra Modi, Defence Minister Rajnath Singh, Chief of Defence Staff General Anil Chauhan, the chiefs of the three services, senior military officers, foreign diplomats and a large number of invited guests were also present. The President arrived at the venue in the traditional presidential buggy, adding to the historical and ceremonial grandeur of the occasion.

The ceremony featured combined military bands from the Indian Army, Indian Navy, Indian Air Force and the Central Armed Police Forces (CAPF). A notable feature of the year's ceremony was the performance of a total of 31 exclusively Indian military compositions throughout the programme. The event began with the Massed Band performing the tune Shankhnaad. This was followed by the Pipes and Drums Band, which performed tunes such as Veer Bharat, Sangam Door, Deshon Ka Sartaj Bharat, Bhagirathi and Arjun. The CAPF Band performed inspirational military compositions such as Bharat Ke Jawan and Vijay Bharat, which were enthusiastically received by the audience.

The Indian Air Force Band performed tunes such as Tiger Hill, Rejoice in Raisina and Swadeshi. The Indian Navy Band presented INS Vikrant, Mission Chandrayaan, Jai Bharati and Hum Tayyar Hain. The Indian Army Band then performed popular military and patriotic compositions such as Faulad Ka Jigar, Agniveer, Kargil 1999 and Taqat Watan. In the final stage of the ceremony, the combined bands performed Kadam Kadam Badhaye Ja, Ae Mere Watan Ke Logon and Drummers Call. The programme concluded traditionally with the tune Sare Jahan Se Achha, the ceremonial lowering of the national flag and the Retreat bugle call, marking the formal conclusion of the 75th Republic Day celebrations.

The Principal Conductor of the ceremony was Lieutenant Colonel Vimal Joshi. The Army Band was led by Subedar Major Moti Lal, the Navy Band by MCPO (MUS-II) M. Anthony, the Air Force Band by Warrant Officer Ashok Kumar and the CAPF Band by Constable G.D. Ranidevi. The buglers were led by Naib Subedar Umesh Kumar, while the Pipes and Drums Band was led by Subedar Major Rajendra Singh. The excellent coordination of the various bands, their disciplined marching and compositions based on Indian classical and military traditions gave the ceremony a grand appearance.

Before the ceremony, the Ministry of Defence and MyGov invited citizens to create and share videos featuring vocal or instrumental renditions of Indian military compositions performed at the Beating Retreat ceremony. The initiative aimed to popularise India's rich military musical heritage and connect young people with patriotic and Indian cultural traditions. During the ceremony, Rashtrapati Bhavan, North Block, South Block and other government buildings on Raisina Hill were illuminated in the colours of the Indian tricolour, adding to the grandeur and memorability of the event.

=== 77th Beating Retreat ceremony (2025) ===
The 77th Beating Retreat ceremony was held on 29 January 2025 at Vijay Chowk, New Delhi. The ceremony marked the formal conclusion of the 76th Republic Day celebrations. It was presided over by Droupadi Murmu, President of India and Supreme Commander of the Indian Armed Forces. Narendra Modi, Rajnath Singh, several Union Ministers, military officers, diplomats and thousands of spectators were also present.

The ceremony began with the Massed Band performing Kadam Kadam Badhaye Ja. This was followed by performances of a total of 30 military and patriotic compositions based entirely on Indian tunes by bands from the Indian Army, Indian Navy, Indian Air Force and Central Armed Police Forces (CAPF). The Pipes and Drums Band performed tunes such as Amar Bharati, Indradhanush, Jai Janmabhoomi, Ganga Jamuna and Veer Siachen.

The Indian Army Band performed compositions such as Veer Sapoot, Taqat Watan, Mera Yuva Bharat, Dhruv and Faulad Ka Jigar. The Indian Navy Band presented Rashtriya Pratham, Nishk Nishpad, Atmanirbhar Bharat, Spread the Light of Freedom and Jai Bharati. The Indian Air Force Band performed Galaxy Rider, Stride, Rubaru, Millennium Flight Fantasy and Riders on the Storm. The CAPF Band presented compositions such as Vijay Bharat, Rajasthan Troops, Ae Watan Tere Liye and Bharat Ke Jawan.

The Principal Conductor of the ceremony was Commander Manoj Sebastian. The Indian Army Band was led by Subedar Major (Honorary Captain) Bishan Bahadur, the Indian Navy Band by M. Anthony (MCPO MUS-II), the Indian Air Force Band by Warrant Officer Ashok Kumar and the CAPF Band by Head Constable G.D. Mahajan Kailash Madhav Rao. The Pipes and Drums Band was conducted by Subedar Major Abhilash Singh, while the buglers were led by Naib Subedar Bhupal Singh.

At 6:15 pm, the Retreat call was sounded on the bugles, following which the national flag was ceremonially lowered. The Massed Band then performed Priyam Bharatam, Ae Mere Watan Ke Logon and finally Sare Jahan Se Achha, marking the formal conclusion of the 76th Republic Day celebrations.

Another major highlight of the 2025 ceremony was the All India School Band Competition, organised by the Ministry of Defence and the Ministry of Education. Approximately 12,857 students from 697 schools across the country participated in the competition. The winning teams were invited as special guests to the Republic Day parade and Beating Retreat ceremony, while a student band team from Jharkhand also gave a special performance in front of the presidential dais.

The musical programme began with the Massed Band performing Kadam Kadam Badhaye Ja. This was followed by the Pipes and Drums Band, which performed compositions such as Amar Bharati, Indradhanush, Veer Siachen and Ganga Jamuna. The Central Armed Police Forces (CAPF) Band performed patriotic compositions such as Vijay Bharat, Rajasthan Troops and Bharat Ke Jawan. The Indian Navy Band presented Atmanirbhar Bharat and Rhythm of the Reef, while the Indian Air Force Band performed Galaxy Rider and Rubaru. The Indian Army Band showcased military tradition and valour through compositions such as Veer Sapoot, Dhruv and Faulad Ka Jigar.

The ceremony concluded on an emotional note with buglers performing Ae Mere Watan Ke Logon and Sare Jahan Se Achha near the flag-hoisting area. Following the ceremonial lowering of the national flag, the national anthem was performed, formally concluding the 76th Republic Day celebrations. The Principal Conductor was Commander Manoj Sebastian, while the Indian Army, Indian Navy and Indian Air Force bands were respectively led by Subedar Major (Honorary Captain) Bishan Bahadur, MCPO M. Anthony and Warrant Officer Ashok Kumar. The CAPF Band was led by Head Constable G.D. Mahajan Kailash Madhav Rao.

The First Signal Regiment of the Indian Army established an advanced audio-visual system to ensure the smooth conduct of the ceremony. A sound system covering approximately 200,000 square metres was installed from Vijay Chowk to the National War Memorial, along with four large LED screens for the convenience of spectators. At the conclusion of the national anthem, citizens present at the venue enthusiastically welcomed the patriotic atmosphere and captured memorable moments to share with their family and friends.

=== 78th Beating Retreat ceremony (2026) ===
The 78th Beating Retreat ceremony was held on 29 January 2026 at Vijay Chowk, New Delhi, marking the formal conclusion of the 77th Republic Day celebrations. The ceremony was presided over by President of India and Supreme Commander of the Armed Forces Droupadi Murmu. Vice President C. P. Radhakrishnan, Prime Minister Narendra Modi, Defence Minister Rajnath Singh, members of the Union Council of Ministers, the chiefs of the three services, senior military officers and a large number of invited guests and citizens were also present.

The 2026 ceremony was particularly notable for the increasing Indianisation of military music and indigenous cultural expression. Bands from all the military services and Central Armed Police Forces performed exclusively Indian or India-inspired compositions. The event showcased military discipline, Indian cultural heritage, modern military achievements and national pride through music and elaborate formations. The spectator galleries installed at Vijay Chowk were also named after Indian musical instruments, including Bansuri, Damru, Ektara, Esraj, Mridangam, Nagada, Pakhawaj, Santoor, Sarangi, Sarinda, Sarod, Shehnai, Sitar, Surbahar, Tabla and Veena, reflecting India's musical traditions.

The ceremony began with the Combined Military Band performing Kadam Kadam Badhaye Ja. This was followed by the Pipes and Drums Band, which performed tunes such as Atulya Bharat, Veer Sainik, Mili Jhuli, Nritya Sarita, Maruni and Jhelum. The Central Armed Police Forces (CAPF) bands performed compositions such as Vijay Bharat, Hathrohi, Jai Ho and Veer Sipahi, creating a patriotic atmosphere.

The Indian Air Force Band performed tunes such as Brave Warrior, Twilight, Alert (Post Horn Gallop) and Flying Star. A special formation based on Operation Sindoor was one of the highlights of the Air Force's performance, honouring the courage and valour of the armed forces. The Indian Navy Band performed Namaste, Sagar Pawan, Matribhumi, Tejasvi and Jai Bharati, while also presenting an impressive Matsya Yantra formation. The Indian Army Band performed patriotic compositions such as Vijayee Bharat, Aarambh Hai, Prachand Hai, Aye Watan, Aye Watan, Anand Math, Sugamya Bharat and Sitare Hind.

The Indian Army's performances also featured special military formations based on Operation Sindoor, 150 years of Vande Mataram, the historic achievement of the India women's national cricket team, Ashni drones, Bhairav Battalion and the ancient Garuda Vyuha military formation. The Navy's Matsya Yantra and the Air Force's Operation Sindoor formations also received considerable appreciation. Following the ceremony, Prime Minister Narendra Modi praised the performances of the various military bands on the social media platform X, describing them as memorable, excellent and magnificent. He specifically appreciated Drummers' Call, the Air Force Band, the Navy Band and the Army's formations.

In the final stage of the ceremony, the combined military bands performed Bharat Ke Shaan, Vande Mataram and Drummers' Call. At 6:15 pm, the buglers sounded the traditional Retreat Call, following which the national flag was ceremonially lowered. The ceremony formally concluded with the melodious tune Sare Jahan Se Achha. Following the conclusion, Rashtrapati Bhavan, North Block, South Block and the entire Raisina Hills complex were illuminated with decorative lighting, creating a grand and emotional spectacle for the spectators.

The Principal Conductor of the ceremony was Squadron Leader Leimapokpam Rupachandra Singh. The Indian Army Band was conducted by Subedar Major Prakash Joshi, the Indian Navy Band by M. Anthony (MCPO MUS II), the Indian Air Force Band by Warrant Officer Ashok Kumar, the CAPF Band by Inspector Chet Ram, the Pipes and Drums Band by Subedar S. P. Chaurasia and the buglers were led by Subedar Manoj Kumar.

== International participation ==
The Beating Retreat is primarily a traditional event of the Indian Armed Forces, in which the bands of the Indian Army, Indian Navy and Indian Air Force play a major role. Generally, the event remains confined to Indian military units, and foreign military contingents do not participate directly on a regular basis. However, on certain occasions, the ceremony receives international attention due to the presence of foreign dignitaries visiting India for the Republic Day celebrations.

When foreign chief guests attend the Republic Day celebrations in a particular year, their presence helps the ceremony receive global media coverage. It becomes an opportunity to showcase India's military traditions and cultural performances on the international stage.

Additionally, due to the expansion of India's defence relations and military diplomacy, representatives of various countries and military officials are sometimes seen attending the event. This makes the ceremony a symbol of India's military diplomacy and cultural soft power.

== Cultural significance ==
The Beating Retreat ceremony is not merely a military event but also an important symbol of India's cultural and national identity. The melodies performed, the coordinated marching of military bands and the tradition of lowering the national flag at sunset reflect the values of discipline, unity and respect. The event strengthens feelings of patriotism and national pride among spectators.

The music and lighting displays featured in the ceremony combine Indian military traditions with modern technology. This combination not only reflects military discipline but also showcases India's cultural diversity and artistic expression. In particular, the melodies performed by military bands transform the event into an emotional and cultural experience.

Along with formally marking the conclusion of the Republic Day celebrations, the ceremony also serves as an important medium of India's cultural diplomacy. Through it, Indian military traditions and cultural heritage are showcased at both national and international levels.

== Broadcasting ==
The Beating Retreat ceremony is broadcast widely across India so that citizens can witness this grand military and cultural event. Doordarshan and other major national broadcasters telecast the ceremony live. The broadcast holds special significance as the final stage of the Republic Day celebrations and is watched by a large number of viewers across the country.

The availability of the ceremony has also increased through digital platforms and online streaming, enabling it to reach global audiences rather than remaining limited to television. This allows India's military traditions and cultural presentations to be viewed and appreciated internationally as well.

In recent years, the government has also taken initiatives to make the music and tunes associated with the ceremony available on digital platforms, helping preserve this tradition and introduce it to the younger generation.

== See also ==
- Republic Day of India
- Delhi Republic Day parade
- Trooping the Colour
- Changing the Guard
- Military parade
- Indian Army Chief's Band
- Ceremony of the Flags
- Indian military bands
- Military parade
- Military Music Wing
- Music of India
