= Robertsons =

Robertsons may refer to:

- Robertson (disambiguation), the name
- Robertson's, the preservatives brandname
