= Robert of Capua =

Robert of Capua may refer to:

- Robert I of Capua (1106–1120)
- Robert II of Capua (1127–1135)
- Robert III of Capua (1155–1158)
