= National Band of the Naval Reserve =

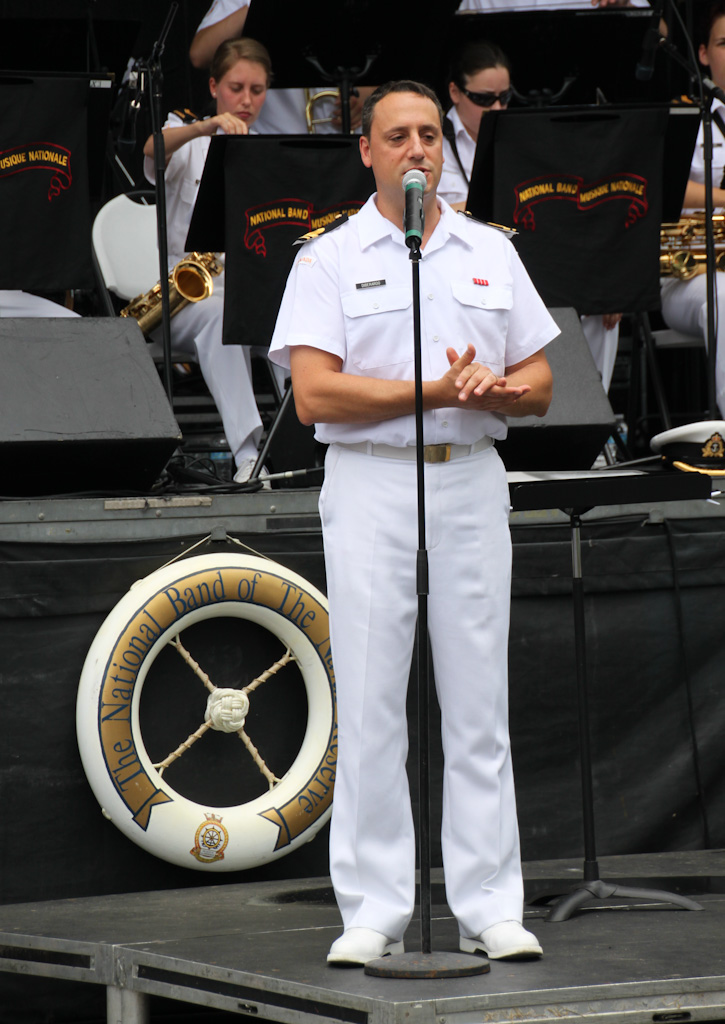
A member of the NBNR speaking at an event in August 2011.

The National Band of the Naval Reserve (NBNR) (French: Musique nationale de la Réserve navale (MNRN)) is a military band of the Royal Canadian Navy currently based in the Naval Museum of Quebec at the Naval Reserve Headquarters (NAVRESHQ) of the Canadian Forces Naval Reserve in Quebec City. Being a reservist band, it is usually at full composition during the summer months, acting as a touring band composed of musicians from the following six active reserve bands:

- HMCS Chippawa Band (Winnipeg)
- HMCS Donnacona Band (Montreal)
- HMCS Montcalm Band (Quebec City)
- HMCS Star Band (Hamilton)
- HMCS Tecumseh Band (Calgary)
- HMCS York Band (Toronto)

It is also designed to augment the Naden Band of Maritime Forces Pacific and the Stadacona Band of Maritime Forces Atlantic on their leave period. It was established in 1976, eight years after the Unification of the Canadian Armed Forces in 1968, with the Music Branch of the Department of National Defence sponsoring an ad hoc amalgamation of naval bands to serve as a central band alongside the Royal Canadian Air Force Band and a public duties band like the Band of the Ceremonial Guard. Today, it takes part in public concerts and local events with its company sized unit that consists of around 75 musicians who, make up different ensembles as well as the main parade and concert bands. It has performed during graduation ceremonies of all RCN personnel and the regular routines of the service.

As per community and national events, local parades and tattoos are priority, such the Royal Nova Scotia International Tattoo and the annual St. Patrick's Day Parade in Montreal. Its joint performances with foreign units have seen It work with reserve bands such as the Marine Corps Band New Orleans. It has performed for many governors general of Canada, most recently with a Canadian Armed Forces guard of honour during the visit of Julie Payette to New Brunswick at the lieutenant governor's residence.

Notable members of the band include François Ferland and Lieutenant Commander Alex Kovacs, the latter having been the principal director since 1990 and the first female director in the RCN.

== Standard repertoire ==
The following is a list of the standard repertoire of the band:

- Heart of Oak
- A Life on the Ocean Wave
- Preobrajensky
- Westering Home
- The Standard of St. George
- Canada Overseas
- Vimy Ridge

== See also ==
- Central Band of the Canadian Armed Forces
- Governor General's Foot Guards
- United States Army Field Band
- Navy bands in Canada

== Links ==
- Official Website
