= Prince Robert (disambiguation) =

"Prince Robert" is one of the 305 ballads collected by Francis James Child during the late nineteenth century.

Prince Robert may also refer to:

- HMCS Prince Robert (F56), a sister ship of HMCS Prince David (F89)
- Prince Robert, Duke of Chartres (1840–1910), a grandson of King Louis-Philippe of France
- Robert I of Capua (died 1120), ruling Prince of Capua
- Robert II of Capua (died 1156), ruling Prince of Capua
- Robert III of Capua (1153–1158), Prince of Capua, as son of William I of Sicily
- Robert, Prince of Taranto (1299?–1364), holder of various titles, including Prince of Taranto, King of Albania, Prince of Achaea, and Emperor of Constantinople
- Prince Robert of Luxembourg (born 1968), grandson of Charlotte, Grand Duchess of Luxembourg

== See also ==
- King Robert (disambiguation)
- Prince Rupert (disambiguation)
