= Roger of Apulia (disambiguation) =

Roger of Apulia (died 1266) was the Italian archbishop of Split in Croatia and an important historian of medieval Hungary.

Roger of Apulia may also refer to any of several dukes of Apulia named Roger:

- Roger I, called Roger Borsa (r. 1085–1111)
- Roger II, also King Roger II of Sicily (r. 1130–54)
- Roger III (r. 1135–48)
- Roger IV (d. 1161)
- Roger V, also King Roger III of Sicily (r. 1192–93)
