= Les Roberts =

Les Roberts may refer to:

- Les Roberts (mystery novel writer) (born 1937), American mystery novel writer
- Les Roberts (epidemiologist) (born 1961), American epidemiologist
- Les Roberts (footballer) (1901–1980), English football inside forward

== See also ==
- Leslie Roberts (born 1962), Canadian journalist
- Le Robert
- Dictionnaires Le Robert
- Roberts (disambiguation)
- Robert (disambiguation)
