= Beverly Robertson (disambiguation) =

Beverly Robertson (1827–1910) was a cavalry officer in the United States Army.

Beverly Robertson may also refer to:

- Beverly Robertson (athlete) (born 1940), New Zealand long jumper and sprinter
- Beverly Robertson (businesswoman) (born 1951), American businesswoman; see Greater Memphis Chamber
