= Robarts =

Robarts or Robartes may refer to:

== Surnames ==
- Charles Robartes (1660–1723), Second Earl of Radnor
- Gerald Robarts (1878–1961), British soldier and squash rackets player
- John Robartes, 1st Earl of Radnor (1606–1685), succeeded his father, Richard, as Baron Robartes
- John Robarts (1917–1982), Canadian politician
- John Robarts (Baháʼí) (1901–1991), Canadian Baháʼí, a Hand of the Cause of God
- John Robarts (VC) (c.1818–1888), English recipient of the Victoria Cross
- Richard Robarts (born 1944), English Formula One driver
- Robert Robartes (1634–1682), Viscount Bodmin
- Thomas Agar-Robartes, 6th Viscount Clifden (1844-1930) known as Lord Robartes from 1882 to 1899

== Other uses ==
- Baron Robartes, a British hereditary peerage first created on 1625 for Richard Robartes
- Robarts Library, the main humanities and social sciences library of the University of Toronto
- Robarts Research Institute, a non-profit medical research facility in London, Ontario with a staff of nearly 600 people

== See also ==
- Michael Robartes and the Dancer, a 1921 book of poems by William Butler Yeats
- Robards (disambiguation)
- Robert (disambiguation)
- Roberts (disambiguation)
- Robertson (disambiguation)
