= Sylvester of Marsico =

Sylvester (c. 1100 – 1162), count of Marsico (it), was a Norman nobleman of the Kingdom of Sicily.

Second son of Godfrey of Ragusa, second eldest son of Roger I of Sicily, he was not a young man when he first rose to importance in the realm. He immediately seized all the property of the Admiral Maio of Bari in Palermo on the latter's assassination (10 November 1160). He was then chosen by the king as one of three triumvirs to succeed Maio's place in the administration.

His appointment was made to please the aristocracy which, under Matthew Bonnellus, had murdered Maio. Sylvester, though distantly related to King William I, was possibly a conspirator with Bonnellus. His fellow triumvirs were Henry Aristippus and the Bishop Palmer.

When in 1162 William was besieging Salerno, Sylvester and Palmer interceded on behalf of the Salernitan notary Matthew of Ajello to prevent a sack. It was his last important act. He died later that year and was replaced by the caïd Peter. He left a daughter named Matilda who is buried in San Cataldo, the foundation of Maio which Sylvester had secured for himself.

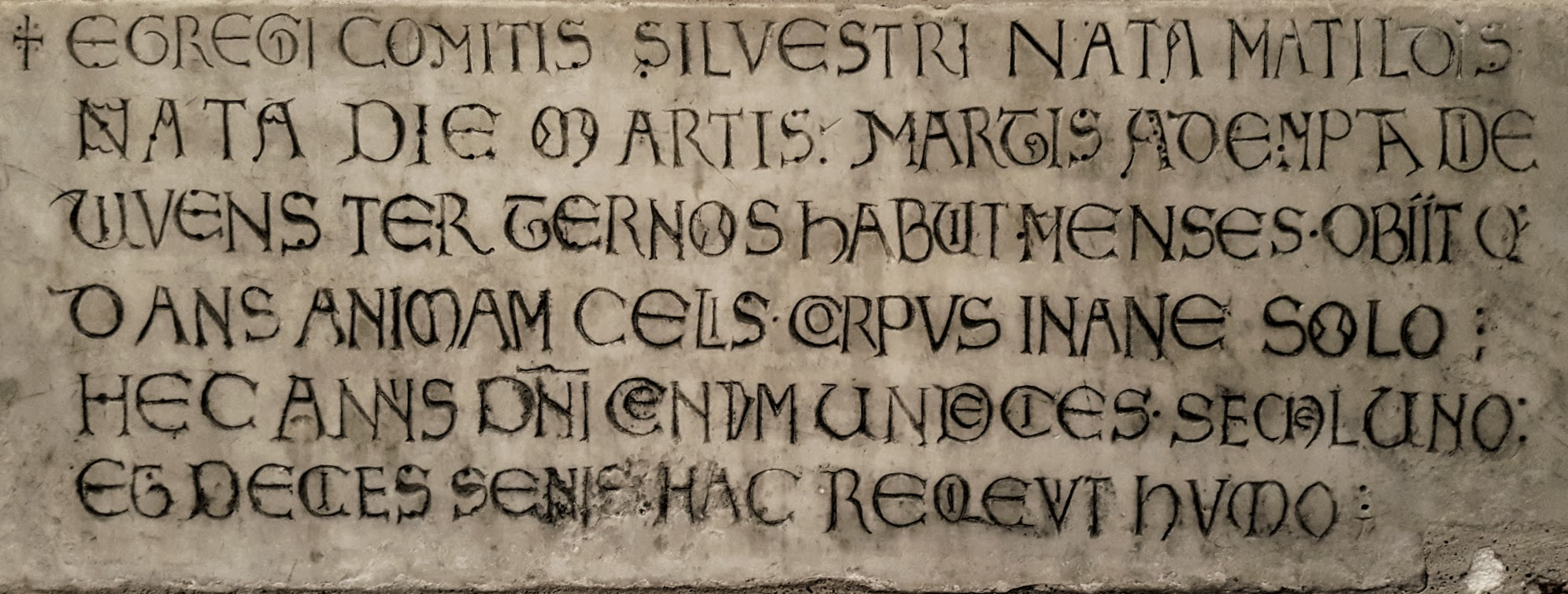

== Sources ==
- Norwich, John Julius. The Kingdom in the Sun 1130-1194. Longman: London, 1970.
- Matthew, Donald. The Norman Kingdom of Sicily. Cambridge University Press: 1992.
