= Beverly Robertson (businesswoman) =

American businesswoman (born 1951)

- Born: 1951 (age 74–75); Memphis, Tennessee, US
- Occupation: Businesswoman
- Years active: 1978–2022
- Spouse: Howard Robertson
- Children: 1

Beverly Robertson (born 1951) is an American businesswoman. In 1997 she became the president of the National Civil Rights Museum in Memphis. In 2019 she became the first African American chief executive of the Greater Memphis Chamber.

== Early life ==
Robertson was born in 1951 in Memphis, Tennessee. She grew up in the Orange Mound neighborhood of Memphis. She lived near Libertyland amusement park, where African Americans were only allowed in on Tuesdays. She was in the first graduating class at the new school Hanley Elementary, and then she graduated from Melrose High School. She went to the University of Memphis, then Memphis State, where she graduated in 1973 with a special education degree. She went on to teach school for three years.

== Career ==
Robertson worked in the hotel industry as a reservation specialist for Holiday Inn Worldwide. She worked for the hotel chain for 19 years and she rose to become the company's director of communications. In 1997 she became the president of the nonprofit National Civil Rights Museum in Memphis where she raised US$43,000,000 to renovate the museum. In 2013 she was inducted into the University of Memphis college of Education Health and Human Services Alumni Chapter. In 2014 she received the Be the Dream MLK Legacy Award.

In 2018 Robertson was named interim president and CEO of the Greater Memphis Chamber. She succeeded Pinnacle Airlines' CEO Philip Trenary who was shot dead in Memphis on September 27, 2018.

On January 2, 2019, Robertson became the first female president of the Greater Memphis Chamber. She was also the first Black person to be named chief executive of the organization. One of her biggest accomplishments as head of the Memphis Chamber was attracting the Ford Motor Company's US$5.6 billion Blue Oval City, which was expected to employ 5,800 from the area. She stepped down from the position in 2022.

In 2021 Robertson was appointed to the Board of Trustees of Christian Brothers University.

Memphis Magazine named Robertson 2022 CEO of the Year for her work at the Greater Memphis Chamber. The award was primarily for her campaign to create economic prosperity for everyone in Memphis, Tennessee. In December 2022 she agreed to be the treasurer of J. W. Gibson's Memphis mayoral campaign.

== Personal life ==
Robertson lives in Memphis, Tennessee, with her husband Howard Robertson. Together they own a marketing firm. The firm was started in 1991 and is called Trust Marketing & Communications Incorporated. Their daughter Adrienne Robertson Hines is also involved with the firm.
