= Ruralco =

- Formerly: Ruralco Holdings Limited
- Industry: Agribusiness
- Founded: 1970
- Headquarters: Sydney, Australia
- Area served: Australia
- Key people: Richard Lee (chairman)
- Revenue: AUD$1.36 billion (2014)
- Net income: AUD$10.565 million (2014)
- Owner: Nutrien
- Website: www.ruralco.com.au

Ruralco is a diversified agricultural company that provides real estate, insurance, auctioneer services, agricultural equipment and other services to the Australian rural community. Ruralco became a wholly owned subsidiary of Canadian company Nutrien in 2019.

== History ==
Ruralco was founded in 1970. By 2001 it had 384 rural supply stores under the brands CRT and Town & Country. In September of that year it merged with Grow Force Australia.

In May 2006 it reverse merged with Australia's oldest publicly listed company, Tasmanian agricultural corporation Roberts.

It sold Monds and Affleck feed supplies to the Ridley Corporation in 2011.

In 2008 it was described as having quietly begun to rival the 'big two' of agricultural industry in Australia, Elders Limited and Landmark. By 2014 it owned 10.1% of Elders, unsuccessfully attempting to purchase the rural services section of Elders for 250 million in 2013. Following falling profits from Elders and the knockback of its purchase offer, it sold all 10.1% of the company.

In February 2014 it acquired Total Eden, a water supplies company, from Anchorage Capital Partners for AUD$57.4 million.

=== Takeover and delisting from ASX ===
In June 2019, Agrium Australia (formerly Landmark, now a wholly owned subsidiary of Canadian company Nutrien) announced the proposed acquisition of Ruralco.

Ruralco shareholders voted overwhelmingly in favour of the $469 million takeover and Ruralco was delisted from the Australian Securities Exchange on 1 October 2019.

Under the new ownership, Ruralco's operations are to be rebranded Nutrien Ag Solutions.

== Subsidiaries ==
Subsidiaries of Ruralco include;

- Combined Rural Traders
- Grow Force Australia
- CQ Agricultural Services
- Total Eden
- Frontier International
- BGa AgriServices
- Archards Irrigation
- Dairy Livestock Services
- Peter Dargan Livestock
- Territory Rural Mcpherson
- BR and C Agents
- Southern Australian Livestock
- Rodwells
- Rawlinson and Brown
- Savage Barker & Backhouse
- Primaries of WA
- Davidson Cameron
- The Farm Shop

=== Joint ownership ===
- AgFarm (with CHS Inc.)
- Grant Daniel & Long (with Grant Daniel & Long)

=== Other acquisitions ===
- Murray River Wholesalers
