= Simon of Taranto =

12th-century Italo-Norman prince

Simon
- Prince of Taranto
- Reign: 1148–1154
- Predecessor: Roger III, Duke of Apulia
- Successor: William I
- Born: 12th century Kingdom of Sicily
- Died: after 1161 unknown
- House: Hauteville family
- Father: Roger II of Sicily
- Mother: Unknown

Simon, illegitimate son of Roger II of Sicily, was declared Prince of Taranto by his father in 1148 following the death of Roger III, Duke of Apulia, Roger II's eldest legitimate son.

== Early life ==
Simon was born out of wedlock to Roger II, king of Sicily. While the identity of his mother is uncertain, Simon was nevertheless given significant status, reflecting his father's willingness to entrust important territories to his children regardless of legitimacy.

== Prince of Taranto ==
Upon the death of his half-brother Roger III in 1148, Roger II invested Simon with the principality of Taranto. The position was prestigious and strategically important, controlling access to parts of southern Italy.

== Loss of title ==
When Roger II died in 1154, the throne passed to his fourth son, William I. Viewing Taranto as too important to entrust to an illegitimate sibling, William immediately stripped Simon of the title and lands. This loss fostered resentment toward the king.

== Revolt of 1161 ==
In 1161, Simon was invited by Matthew Bonnellus to lead a rebellion in Palermo against King William I. Simon allied with his nephew, Tancred of Lecce (the illegitimate son of Roger of Apulia). On 9 March 1161, Simon and Tancred seized the royal palace, detaining King William, Queen Margaret, and their two sons. During the uprising, a massacre of Muslims in Palermo was instigated. Initially, rebels considered crowning the young Roger IV, Duke of Apulia, but popular sentiment shifted towards making Simon king.

Before Simon could secure his claim, the rebellion collapsed. The rebels released the royal family and retreated. In exchange for a pardon, Simon and others accepted exile from the kingdom.

== Later life ==
Simon did not attempt to claim the throne after William I's death in 1166, contrary to fears. Instead, Henry, Count of Montescaglioso claimed Taranto and Simon's former territories. Simon's later life and death remain obscure.

Preceded by William I	Prince of Taranto; 1148–1154	Succeeded by William I
