= William I of Sicily =

King of Sicily from 1154 to 1166

William I

King of Sicily
- Reign: 26 February 1154 – 7 May 1166
- Predecessor: Roger II
- Successor: William II
- Born: 1120 or 1121; Palermo, Kingdom of Sicily
- Died: 7 May 1166; Palermo, Kingdom of Sicily
- Burial: Monreale Cathedral
- Spouse: Margaret of Navarre (m. 1149)
- Issue: Roger IV, Duke of Apulia; Robert III, Prince of Capua; William II; Henry, Prince of Capua
- House: Hauteville
- Father: Roger II of Sicily
- Mother: Elvira of Castile

William I (1120 or 1121 – 7 May 1166), called the Bad or the Wicked (Sicilian: Gugghiermu lu Malu), was the second king of Sicily, ruling from his father's death in 1154 to his own in 1166. He was the fourth son of Roger II and Elvira of Castile.

William's title "the Bad" seems little merited and expresses the bias of the historian Hugo Falcandus and the baronial class against the king and the official class by whom he was guided. Recent scholarship has also stressed that William inherited a mainland political order still dependent on the cooperation of counts and major barons in Apulia and the Terra di Lavoro, making his reign especially vulnerable to aristocratic coalitions and provincial revolt.

== Early life ==
William was the son of King Roger II of Sicily, grandson of Count Roger I of Sicily, and great-grandson of Tancred of Hauteville. He grew up with little expectation of ruling. The deaths of his three older brothers Roger, Tancred, and Alfonso between 1138 and 1148 changed matters, though when his father died William was still not well-prepared to take his place.

== Kingship ==
The Kingdom of Sicily as it existed at the ascension of William I in 1154. The borders remained virtually unchanged for 700 years.

On assuming power, William kept the administration which had guided his father's rule for his final years. Only the Englishman Thomas Brun was removed, and the chancellor Maio of Bari was promoted. The real power in the kingdom was at first exercised by Maio, a man of low birth, whose title ammiratus ammiratorum was the highest in the realm. Maio continued Roger's policy of excluding much of the nobility from central administration and sought also to curtail the liberties of the towns. On the mainland, however, royal authority still relied heavily on negotiated relations with the peninsular aristocracy: counts and leading barons remained crucial nodes of military mobilization and local order, especially in Apulia and the Terra di Lavoro. The barons, always chafing against the royal power, were encouraged to revolt by Pope Adrian IV, whose recognition William had not yet sought, by the Byzantine Emperor Manuel I Comnenus, and by the Holy Roman Emperor Frederick I.

At the end of 1155, Byzantine troops recovered Bari, Trani, Giovinazzo, Andria, Taranto and began to besiege Brindisi. William and his army landed on the peninsula and destroyed the Byzantine fleet (4 ships) and army at Brindisi on 28 May 1156, and recovered Bari. Adrian came to terms at Benevento on 18 June 1156, where he and William signed the Treaty of Benevento, abandoning the rebels and confirming William as king. During the summer of 1157, William sent a fleet of 164 ships carrying 10,000 men to sack Euboea and Almira. In 1158 William made peace with the Byzantines. The rising of 1155–56, centred on Robert of Loritello and reinforced by Byzantine intervention, revealed how fragile royal control could be outside Sicily. Even loyal counts such as those of Andria and Manoppello were most effective when operating alongside the king's own forces rather than as autonomous provincial commanders.

These diplomatic successes were probably due to Maio; on the other hand, the African dominions were lost to the Almohads, and it is possible that he advised their abandonment in face of the dangers threatening the kingdom from the north. In 1156, a revolt began in Sfax and quickly spread and nothing was done to put it down. In 1159, the admiral Peter led a raiding expedition against the Saracen-held Balearic Islands with 160 ships. He tried to relieve besieged Mahdia with the same fleet, but turned around just after engaging in battle. Peter did not fall out of favour, but no further assistance was sent to the Christians holding out in Mahdia and the city surrendered on 11 January 1160, ending the "African empire".

The policy of Maio led to a general conspiracy, and in November 1160 Maio was murdered in Palermo by Matthew Bonello, leader of the Sicilian nobles. The barons, however, had long been plotting to overthrow the king. Desiring a weak power on the throne, they had been eyeing the king's eldest son, Roger IV, Duke of Apulia, as a possible replacement for his father.

After the assassination of Maio, the royal palace was stormed by two of the king's own relatives: his illegitimate half-brother Simon, whom he had dispossessed of Taranto early in his reign and his bastard nephew Tancred, the count of Lecce. The king was captured along with his whole family, his life being barely spared by Richard of Mandra, a former follower of Robert of Loritello who had become a royal master constable and commander of the salaried knights of the royal household. Roger was then paraded through the streets and it was announced that he would be crowned in the cathedral three days thence.

For a while the king remained in the hands of the conspirators who purposed murdering or just deposing him, but the people and the army rallied round him; he recovered power, crushed the Sicilian rebels, had Bonello blinded, and in a short campaign reduced the rest of the Regno, avenging the rebel burning of Butera. During the initial assault on the palace, to release the captive king, the king's son Roger was killed by a wayward arrow (though the historian Falcandus, seemingly ever-ready to impugn the royal character, has the king kicking his "faithless" son dead). The crown nevertheless still had to reimpose control across the mainland, where some counties remained vacant after rebellion while others were redefined or newly elevated in order to strengthen royal authority.

== Later years ==
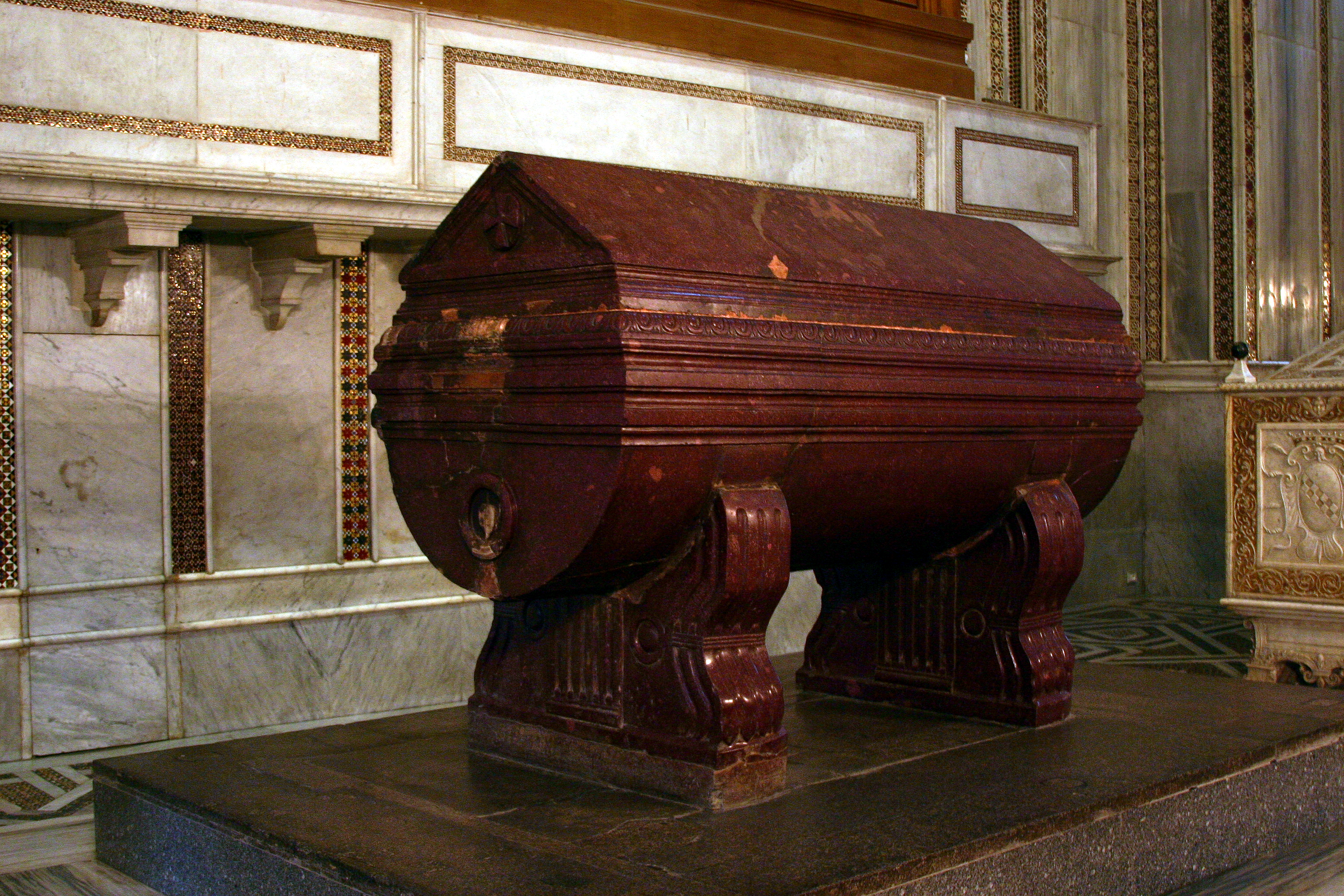
William's sarcophagus

Thus freed from feudal revolts, William confided the government to men trained in Maio's school, creating a triumvirate: the grand protonotary, Matthew of Ajello; Count Sylvester of Marsico, who had inherited Maio's property; and the Bishop Palmer of Syracuse, elect, but not consecrated. His latter years were peaceful; he became the champion of the true pope against the Holy Roman Emperor, and Alexander III was installed in the Lateran Palace in November 1165 by a guard of Normans. William's later government on the mainland did not simply restore the arrangements of Roger II unchanged. Recent work has emphasized that the crown increasingly relied on overlapping roles held by selected aristocrats and royal officials, combining county lordship, military command, and provincial justice in the effort to stabilise Apulia and the Terra di Lavoro after the revolts.

William died on 7 May 1166, and was interred in Palermo Cathedral, although he was later moved to Monreale Cathedral by his son and heir William II of Sicily when that building was completed.

== Description ==
According to Romuald Guarna, William was handsome of aspect and majestic of presence, corpulent of body, sublime of stature, haughty and greedy for honours, and more feared than loved.

According to the French author Alexandre Dumas, who was able to see the king's body in his sarcophagus, he was around six feet tall.

== Children ==
By his wife, Margaret of Navarre, daughter of García Ramírez of Navarre, he had four sons:

1. Roger IV, Duke of Apulia (1152–1161)
2. Robert III, Prince of Capua (1153–c. 1160)
3. William II of Sicily (1153–1189)
4. Henry, Prince of Capua (1158–1172)

== Controversial accounts ==
De Mulieribus Claris by Boccaccio said that at the birth of Constance, whom it described as the daughter of William, a Calabrian abbot named Joachim told William that she would cause the destruction of Sicily. William believed the prediction and forced the young Constance to become a nun to prevent her from marrying and having children. This apparently contradicted the fact that Constance was indeed the posthumous daughter of Roger II and half-sister of William. Giovanni Villani said William I sought to put her to death due to the prediction until Tancred, a bastard son of Count Roger I of Sicily, persuaded him to send her to a convent instead.

Joachim Camerarius argued that Constance was simply sent to the convent during the coup against William I for her safety and stayed there until her betrothal without ever being a nun. Hugo Falcandus and Richard of San Germano argued Constance was brought up and educated in royal palace rather than a monastery. François Eudes de Mézeray said Constance had never become a nun.

== Sources ==
- Alio, Jacqueline (2017). Margaret, Queen of Sicily. Trinacria.
- Fernández-Aceves, Hervin (2019). "Royal comestabuli and Military Control in the Sicilian Kingdom: A Prosopographical Contribution to the Study of Italo-Norman Aristocracy". Medieval Prosopography. 34: 1–34.
- Fernández-Aceves, Hervin (2020). County and Nobility in Norman Italy: Aristocratic Agency in the Kingdom of Sicily, 1130–1189. London and New York: Bloomsbury Academic.
- Loud, Graham A.; Metcalfe, Alex, eds. (2002). The Society of Norman Italy. Brill.
- Luscombe, David; Riley-Smith, Jonathan, eds. (2004). The New Cambridge Medieval History: Volume 4, C. 1024–c. 1198, Part II. Cambridge University Press.
- Norwich, John Julius. The Kingdom in the Sun 1130–1194. Longman: London, 1970.
- History of the Tyrants of Sicily at Patrologia Latina.

Regnal titles
Preceded by Tancred	Prince of Taranto; 1138–1144	Succeeded by Simon
Preceded by Roger III	Duke of Apulia and Calabria; 1149–1151	Succeeded by Roger IV
Preceded by Roger II	King of Sicily; 1154–1166	Succeeded by William II
