= Robert III =

Robert III may refer to:

- Robert III of Scotland, king of Scotland from 1390 to 1406
- Robert III, Count of Worms (800–834)
- Robert III, Prince of Capua (1153–1158)
- Robert III, Count of Loritello (died 1182)
- Robert III de Brus (fl. 12th century, died ca. 1191)
- Robert III, Count of Dreux (1185–1234)
- Robert III, Count of Flanders (1249 – September 17, 1322)
- Robert III of Artois (1287–1342)
- Robert III de La Marck (1491–1537)
