= Richard Lee (cricketer, born 1950) =

Australian cricketer, banker and businessman

Personal information
- Full name: Richard John Lee
- Born: 6 March 1950 (age 76); Ryde, New South Wales, Australia
- Batting: Right-handed
- Bowling: Right-arm medium

Domestic team information
- Years: Team
- 1972–1974: Oxford University

Career statistics
Competition	First-class	List A
Matches	24	4
Runs scored	950	55
Batting average	21.59	13.75
100s/50s	1/3	0/0
Top score	130	27
Balls bowled	2,262	237
Wickets	29	5
Bowling average	37.27	35.00
5 wickets in innings	0	0
10 wickets in match	0	–
Best bowling	4/56	3/35
Catches/stumpings	14/–	4/–
- Source: Cricinfo, 25 April 2020

Richard John Lee AM (born 6 March 1950) is an Australian business executive and a former banker and first-class cricketer.

Lee was born at the Sydney suburb of Ryde in March 1950. He studied at the University of Sydney, before going as a Rhodes Scholar to Worcester College at the University of Oxford.

While studying at Oxford, Lee played first-class cricket for Oxford University, making his debut against Leicestershire at Oxford in 1972. Lee played first-class cricket for Oxford until 1974, making a total of 23 appearances. An all-rounder, he scored a total of 894 runs for Oxford, at an average of 21.28 and a high score of 130. This score, which was his only first-class century, came against Lancashire in 1973. With his right-arm medium pace bowling, he took 27 wickets at a bowling average of 39.18 and best figures of 4 for 56. In addition to playing first-class cricket for Oxford, he also appeared in four List A one-day matches for the university in the 1973 Benson & Hedges Cup. Lee also played a first-class match for a combined Oxford and Cambridge Universities team against the touring New Zealanders in 1973.

After graduating from Oxford, Lee returned to Australia, where he worked for CSR in the international marketing and pricing of raw sugar exports, before joining Rothschild Australia in 1985. He retired from Rothchild as a chief executive officer in 2001, before rejoining CSR as a director in 2005, a position he retained until its acquisition by Wilmar International in 2011. He later became a director of Oil Search, and in the 2015 Birthday Honours he was made a Member of the Order of Australia for “significant service to business and commerce through a range of executive roles, and to sporting and charitable groups”. In September 2016, he was appointed the chairman of Ruralco.
