= Roger IV of Apulia =

Roger IV (1152–1161) was the eldest son of William I of Sicily and Margaret of Navarre. Twice in his short life he was the object of the barons' intent to replace his father as king. When he was made duke of Apulia is unknown, probably after his father's assumption of power in 1154.

In 1156, barons opposed to Maio of Bari began to consider removing not only the emir, but also the king, and putting Roger on the throne. Since Roger was a minor, the barons would be free from meaningful royal control. In 1161, after the successful assassination of Maio, the rebels paraded Roger through the streets, announcing his succession and heralding his coming coronation in the Cathedral of Palermo. However, the populace instead supported the succession claims of Simon, erstwhile Prince of Taranto, the king's illegitimate half-brother. The people rebelled and the palace was stormed. In the ensuing battle, young Roger was killed by a wayward arrow to the eye. An alternative theory, advanced by William's enemy Falcandus, is that Roger died after repeated kicking by his father, who was in a rage at having been betrayed by his son.

Roger was interred in the cathedral with his brother Henry, Prince of Capua, but later he was moved to the chapel of Saint Mary Magdalene in Monreale.
