= HMCS Cape Breton =

HMCS Cape Breton is a name used by several ships of the Royal Canadian Navy:

- HMCS Cape Breton (K350), River-class frigate launched in 1942
- HMCS Cape Breton (ARE 100), Cape-class maintenance ship named in 1952

== Battle honours ==
- Atlantic, 1941–45
- Normandy, 1944
- English Channel, 1944–45
