= Robert II =

Robert II may refer to:

- Robert II, Count of Worms (770–807)
- Robert II of France (972–1031)
- Robert Curthose, Duke of Normandy (c. 1051 – 1134) also known as Robert II
- Robert II de Brus (fl. 1138, died ca. 1189 or 1194)
- Robert II de la Marck (1468–1536)
- Robert II of Dreux (1154–1218)
- Robert II of Scotland (1316–1390), known as "The Steward"
- Robert II of Flanders (1065–1111), known as "Robert of Jerusalem"
- Robert II of Boves (died c. 1227)
- Robert II of Fouencamps (died 1247)
- Robert II, Count of Artois (1250–1302)
- Robert II, Duke of Burgundy (1248–1306)
- Robert Hugo, Duke of Parma (1909–1974), pretender to the defunct throne of the Duchy of Parma as Robert II
