= Robert I =

Robert I may refer to:

- Robert I, Duke of Neustria (697–748)
- Robert I of France (866–923), King of France, 922–923, rebelled against Charles the Simple
- Rollo, Duke of Normandy (c. 846 – c. 930; reigned 911–927)
- Robert I Archbishop of Rouen (d. 1037), Archbishop of Rouen, 989–1037, son of Duke Richard I of Normandy
- Robert the Magnificent (1000–1035), also named Robert I, Duke of Normandy, 1027–1035), father of William the Conqueror. Sometimes known as Robert II, with Rollo of Normandy, c. 860 – c. 932, as Robert I because Robert was his baptismal name when he became a Christian
- Robert I, Duke of Burgundy (1011–1076), Duke of Burgundy, 1032–1076
- Robert I, Count of Flanders (1029–1093), also named Robert the Frisian, Count of Flanders, 1071–1093
- Robert I de Brus (ca. 1078 – 1141/1142)
- Robert I of Dreux (c. 1123 – 1188), Count of Braine in France, son of King Louis VI
- Robert I of Artois (1216–1250), son of King Louis VIII of France
- Robert I of Scotland (1274–1329), also named Robert the Bruce, King of Scotland, 1306–1329, helped achieve Scotland's independence
- Robert of Naples (1277–1343), King of Naples, 1309–1343, son of King Charles II of Naples
- Robert Estienne (1503–1559), scholar-printer and son of Henry Estienne
- Robert I, Duke of Parma (1848–1907)
- Rupprecht, Crown Prince of Bavaria (1869–1955)
