= Greater Memphis Chamber =

Memphis Tennessee chamber of commerce

The Greater Memphis Chamber is an organization in Memphis, Tennessee, which attempts to improve business to business relationships. The organization also helps companies understand the advantages of doing business in Memphis.

== Mission ==
The mission of the Greater Memphis Chamber is "to help Memphis grow". The organization works with the local, state, and federal government to benefit members of the Greater Memphis Chamber. They provide educational programs and they act as a conduit for business to business relationships.

== History ==
The chamber was founded in March 1838 by two businessmen, Col. Nathaniel Anderson and Louis Trezevant. The city of Memphis was new at the time and they formed the organization to function as a chamber of commerce.

In late 2022 the chamber was led by President & CEO Ted Townsend. He was promoted from his position at the chamber: director of economic development. Townsend succeeded Beverly Robertson who was in the position for four years and stepped down in 2022. Robertson succeeded Pinnacle Airlines CEO Philip Trenary who was shot dead in Memphis, Tennessee on September 27, 2018. Trenary served as the CEO of the Chamber until his death.

One of the chamber's biggest accomplishments was the Blue Oval City deal that they made with the Ford Motor Company. The US$5.6 billion Blue Oval City, was expected to employ 5,800 people from the Memphis area. In 2026 Townsend was forced out of his role as Chamber President and CEO due to questionable leadership tactics and accusations of sexual assault against his subordinates.
