= Philip Trenary =

American businessman

- Born: August 1, 1954; Pawhuska, Oklahoma, U.S.
- Died: September 27, 2018 (aged 64); Memphis, Tennessee, U.S.
- Cause of death: Murder
- Education: Oklahoma State University
- Known for: Founder of Lone Star Airlines
- Title: CEO and President, Greater Memphis Chamber
- Spouse: Bridget Trenary (divorced)
- Children: 3

Philip Hartley Trenary (August 1, 1954 – September 27, 2018) was an American businessman and civic leader who was the CEO and president of the Greater Memphis Chamber of Commerce and a former CEO of Pinnacle Airlines.

== Early life ==
Philip Hartley Trenary was born on August 1, 1954, in Pawhuska, Oklahoma, the son of May Ruth and Buck Trenary.

He grew up nearby in Shidler, Oklahoma. He learned to fly a plane before he learned to drive a car.

Trenary earned a bachelor's degree in aeronautical engineering technology from Oklahoma State University in 1979.

== Career ==
In 1984, Trenary founded Exec Express Airlines (EEA) in Stillwater, Oklahoma. After EEA was moved to Texas in 1987, it was renamed Lone Star Airlines. In 1997, Trenary moved to Memphis to run a local airline that would become Pinnacle Airlines, a $1 billion turnover, regional airline employing 7,700 people.

== Personal life and death ==
Trenary was married to Bridget, they had three children, and later divorced.

Trenary was murdered in Memphis on September 27, 2018 during an attempted robbery. He was 64.
