= Trebor =

Trebor may refer to:

- Trebor (confectionery), a British confectionery company
- Trebor (composer), a 14th-century composer
- Robert Trebor (1953–2025), American actor
- Trebor Edwards (born 1939), Welsh tenor
- Trebor Healey, American poet and novelist
- Trebor Jay Tichenor (1940–2014), American composer and pianist
- Trebor Mai (Robert Williams, 1830–1877), Welsh poet
- Trebor Ohl (Cora Stuart Wheeler, 1852–1897), American poet and author
- Trebor Pena (born 2002), American football player
- Trebor Worthen (born 1980), American politician
- The title character of Wizardry: Proving Grounds of the Mad Overlord and its sequels
