= Roberts Stadium =

Roberts Stadium is the name of several stadiums in the United States:

- M. M. Roberts Stadium in Hattiesburg, Mississippi as part of the University of Southern Mississippi's campus
- Roberts Municipal Stadium, a defunct indoor arena located in Evansville, Indiana.
- Lanphier Park, also known as Robin Roberts Stadium at Lanphier Park, Springfield, Illinois, USA
- Roberts Stadium (New Jersey), an outdoor soccer stadium at Princeton University
- Roberts Field a.k.a. Roberts Stadium, a former football stadium used by San Francisco State University
