= Roberts (agriculture company) =

Agricultural service company in Tasmania, Australia

Roberts Limited is an agricultural services company with operations in Tasmania. Established in 1865, until 2006 it was Australia's oldest publicly listed company. The company became a wholly owned subsidiary of Ruralco in 2006, following a successful off-market takeover bid.

It operates the only livestock sales yards in Tasmania, 14 feed stores. and insurance, irrigation, fertilizer, wool sales and real-estate services for rural customers.

== History ==
Roberts Limited was established as Kemp, Roberts and Co, an auctioneer business founded by Henry Llewelyn Roberts (husband of Mary Roberts Grant, founder of Hobart Zoo), George Anthony Kemp and John William Abbott. Its first operations were in Conara, Tasmania. Early on it acquired a Launceston wool merchants, amalgamated with Allan Stewart, and later purchased the Farmers' Co-Operative Auctioneers in 1957 to become Roberts, Stewart & Co It also acquired the local Massey Ferguson distribution business.

In 2006, a reverse takeover bid saw Roberts become a subsidiary of Ruralco, with Roberts shareholders owning around 70% of the merged entity.

In 2014, Lee Kernaghan performed at the opening of their new flagship store.

In 2019, Ruralco shareholders voted in favour of the proposed acquisition of the company by Nutrien, a Canadian company listed on the Toronto and New York Stock Exchanges.

Ruralco was delisted from the Australian Securities Exchange on 1 October 2019.
