= Prince Rupert (disambiguation) =

Prince Rupert may refer to:

== People ==
- Prince Rupert of the Rhine (Rupert, Count Palatine of the Rhine, Duke of Bavaria) (1619–1682), noted German and British soldier, admiral, scientist, sportsman, colonial governor, and amateur artist.
- Rupert Cambridge, Viscount Trematon (Prince Rupert of Teck) (1907–1928), a member of the British royal family, a great-grandson of Queen Victoria
- Prince Rupert Loewenstein (1933–2014), German aristocrat and band manager

== Places ==
- Prince Rupert, British Columbia, a city in Canada
- Prince Rupert (electoral district), a provincial electoral district in the Canadian province of British Columbia
- Prince Rupert, Edmonton, a neighbourhood in Edmonton, Alberta, Canada

== Airports ==
- Prince Rupert Airport, an airport outside Prince Rupert, British Columbia, Canada
- Prince Rupert/Digby Island Water Aerodrome, an airport outside Prince Rupert, British Columbia, Canada
- Prince Rupert/Seal Cove Water Aerodrome, an airport adjacent to Prince Rupert, British Columbia, Canada

== Organizations ==
- Prince Rupert Port Authority, a port authority responsible for all waterfront properties on Prince Rupert Harbour, British Columbia, owned by the Canadian federal government
- Prince Rupert Secondary School, a public high school in Prince Rupert, British Columbia, Canada
- School District 52 Prince Rupert, a school district in British Columbia, Canada, serving Prince Rupert and Hartley Bay

== Ships ==
- Prince Rupert (1841 HBC vessel), a sailing ship chartered by the New Zealand Company ships in 1841
- SS Prince Rupert, a Canadian steamship in service along the coast of British Columbia, Alaska, and Washington from 1910 to 1956
- HMS Prince Rupert (1915), a British monitor of the Royal Navy launched in 1915 and scrapped in 1923
- HMCS Prince Rupert (K324), a Royal Canadian Navy frigate in commission during World War II
- Queen of Prince Rupert, a Canadian roll-on/roll-off ferry in service on the coast of British Columbia from 1966 to 2009
- Prince Rupert (1744 HBC vessel), operated by the Hudson's Bay Company (HBC) from 1744 to 1760, see Hudson's Bay Company vessels
- Prince Rupert (1755 HBC vessel), operated by the HBC from 1755 to 1768, see Hudson's Bay Company vessels
- Prince Rupert (1769 HBC vessel), operated by the HBC from 1769 to 1786, see Hudson's Bay Company vessels
- Prince Rupert (1827 HBC vessel), operated by the HBC from 1827 to 1841, see Hudson's Bay Company vessels
- Prince Rupert (1865 HBC vessel), operated by the HBC from 1865 to 1886, see Hudson's Bay Company vessels
- Prince Rupert (1887 HBC vessel), operated by the HBC from 1887 to 1891, see Hudson's Bay Company vessels

== Objects ==
- Prince Rupert's drop, glass objects created by dripping molten glass into cold water
