= Robards =

Robards may refer to:

- Jason Robards (1922–2000), American actor
- Jason Robards, Sr. (1892–1963), American stage and screen actor; father of Jason Robards
- Karen Robards (born 1955), American author of romance novels
- Sam Robards (born 1961), American actor; son of Jason Robards and Lauren Bacall
- William S. Robards (fl. 1806–1830), American politician from North Carolina
- Willis Robards (1873–1921), American actor, film director, and film producer

== Places ==
- Robards, Kentucky

== See also ==
- Robarts (disambiguation)
