= King Robert =

King Robert may refer to:

== People ==
- Robert I of France (c.866–923), King of France
- Robert II of France (972–1031), King of France
- Robert I of Scotland (1274–1329), known as Robert the Bruce, King of Scotland
- Robert II of Scotland (1316–1390), King of Scotland
- Robert III of Scotland (c. 1337–1406), King of Scotland
- Robert, King of Naples (1276–1343), known as Robert the Wise, King of Naples
- Rupprecht, Crown Prince of Bavaria (1869–1955), claimed successor to the thrones of England and Scotland as Robert I and IV

== Fictional characters ==
- Robert Baratheon, the fictional King of Westeros in George R. R. Martin's A Song of Ice and Fire series

== See also ==
- Prince Robert (disambiguation)
