= Roberts, West Virginia =

- Unincorporated community
- Location within the state of West Virginia Roberts (the United States)
- Coordinates: 39°22′42″N 80°40′6″W
- Country: United States
- State: West Virginia
- County: Doddridge
- Elevation: 837 ft (255 m)
- Time zone: UTC-5 (Eastern (EST))
  - Summer (DST): UTC-4 (EDT)
- GNIS ID: 1555494

Roberts is an unincorporated community in Doddridge County, West Virginia, United States. Its post office is closed.
