= Naden Band of Maritime Forces Pacific =

Canadian military band

Naden Band of The Royal Canadian Navy
- La Musique Naden de la Marine royale canadienne
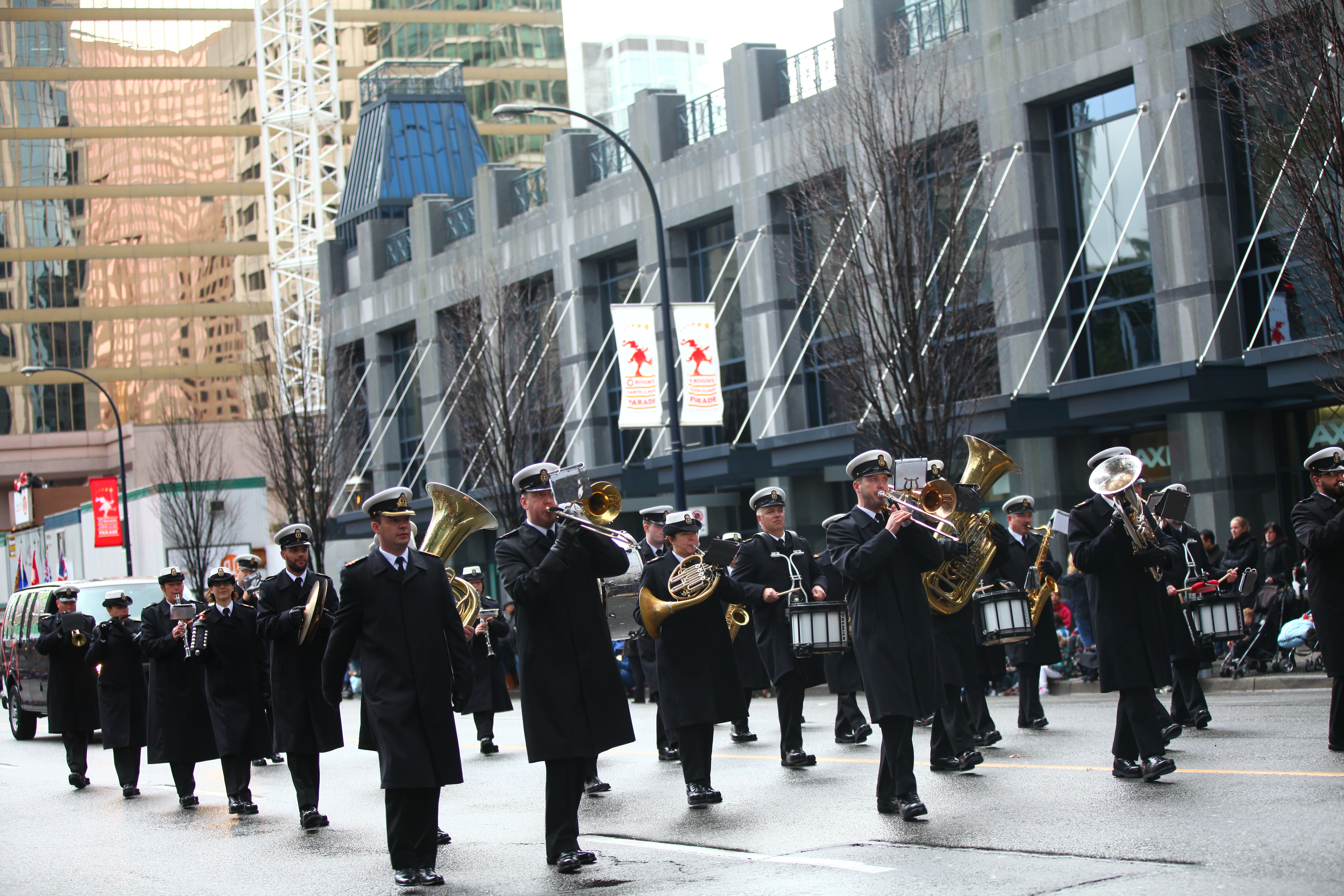
- Members of the band parading through downtown Vancouver in 2012.
- Founded: August 1940
- Country: Canada
- Branch: Royal Canadian Navy
- Type: Military band
- Size: 35 members
- Part of: Maritime Forces Pacific
- Headquarters: CFB Esquimalt, British Columbia
- Nickname: MARPAC Band
- March: "Heart of Oak"

Commanders
- Commanding Officer/Director of Music: Lieutenant (Navy) Benjamin Van Slyke, CD
- Band Chief: Chief Petty Officer Second Class Brayden Wise, CD
- Notable commanders: Lieutenant (Navy) Catherine Norris (2018-2022, first woman CO); Lieutenant (Navy) Matthew Clark; Captain Leonard Camplin (1968-1972); Major J.F. McGuire

The Naden Band of the Royal Canadian Navy (French: La Musique Naden de la Marine royale canadienne) is one of six regular force military bands of the Canadian Forces. The Royal Canadian Navy band is based at CFB Esquimalt in Esquimalt, British Columbia, that serves as the official musical unit of the Canadian Forces Maritime Forces Pacific Command (MARPAC).

== History ==
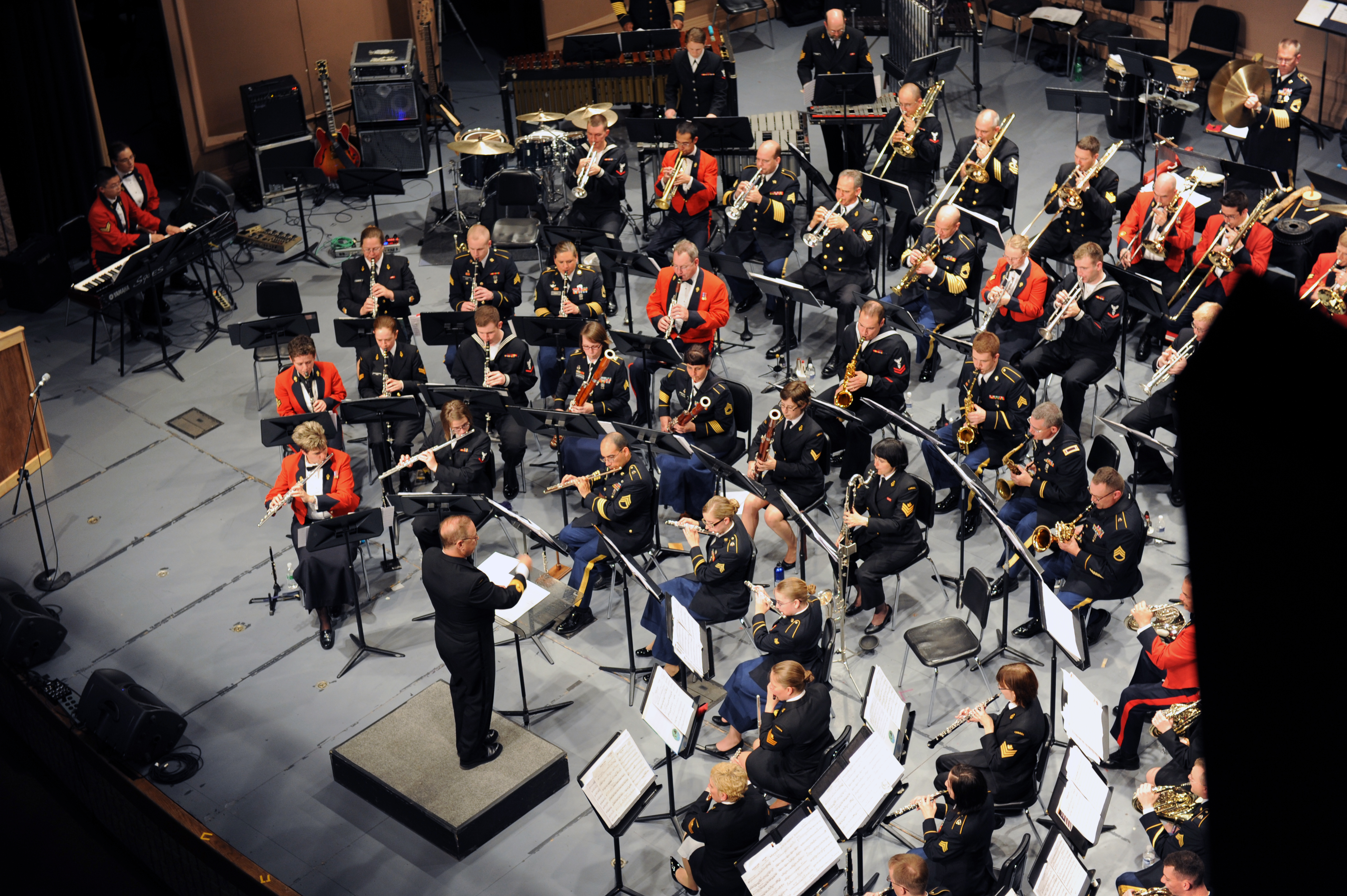
Members of the Naden Band performing with the United States Navy Band Northwest and the Band of the 15th Field Regiment during the 20th International Military Band Concert at the Bremerton Performing Arts Center.

It was established in August 1940, eight months following the establishment of the Stadacona Band of Maritime Forces Atlantic. Known originally as the HMCS Naden Band, it was formed from auditioned in Victoria and Vancouver. It was dissolved in 1994 as a result of a federal reorganization of Canadian military bands. For three years, a small group of Regular Force musicians augmented by volunteers formed the HMCS Malahat Band, and filled the void by providing musical support for MARPAC. After public outcry occurred, the Minister of National Defence ordered the re-creation of the band in 1997. On Victoria Day in 2013, the band unveiled five percussionists at the front of the band that would form the permanent corps of drums. The longest-serving member of the band is Petty Officer Second Class Michael Savich, who served for 41 years from 1976 to 2017.

== Notable performances ==
In the decades following the Second World War, Naden Band continued to represent the Canadian Forces throughout British Columbia and the rest of Canada, receiving fame for its performances at events such as the Pacific National Exhibition, Klondike Days, the Grey Cup and the Calgary Stampede and the opening of the Legislative Assembly of British Columbia.

=== Timeline ===
- 1958 – British Columbia Centennial
- 1972 – It accompanied the 2nd Canadian Destroyer Squadron in a tour of Australia, Fiji, and New Zealand.
- Salvation Army Christmas Concerts (annually since 1979)
- Expo 70 in Osaka, Japan
- Visit to Vladivostok, Russian SFSR in 1991
- September 2010 – Canadian Naval Centennial Tattoo
- 2012 – International Military Band Concert at Joint Base Lewis–McChord
- 7 July 2013 – Pacific Tattoo
- 19 August 2017 – 75th anniversary parade of the Dieppe Raid in Dieppe, France
- November–December 2018 – Represent the RCN at the bicentennial celebrations of the Chilean Navy.
- 6 June 2019 – 75th anniversary ceremony of the D-Day landings
