= Henry of Capua =

Henry (Henricus, Arricus or Arrico) (1160–1172) was the youngest and second surviving son of William I of Sicily by Margaret of Navarre. By his father's will he succeeded to the title Prince of Capua, an appanage to the throne, while his brother William II succeeded to the throne. Henry's coronation as prince was postponed from the death of his father (1166).

Henry was present with William at Taranto, where the young king awaited his Greek bride. They planned to return via Capua and there invest Henry with his principality, (Note: Falcando states Henry had been granted the Principality of Capua long before his father's death.) but not far off from the town, Henry came down with a high fever. He was hurried to Salerno and thence to Palermo, but died within the month. According to legend, he was betrothed to a daughter of Malcolm IV of Scotland on his deathbed, but this is false. Malcolm had no issue. He was originally buried in the chapel of Saint Mary Magdalene, but was moved by his brother to Monreale, the final resting place of most of his family.

The death of Henry made his aunt Princess Constance, confined to Santissimo Salvatore, Palermo as a nun from childhood, the only legitimate heir to the throne; despite this, she remained confined in her monastery, until 1184.

== Sources ==
- Falcando, Ugo (1998). Loud, Graham A.; Wiedemann, Thomas (eds.). The History of the Tyrants of Sicily by "Hugo Falcandus," 1154-69. Manchester University Press.
- Alio, Jacqueline. Margaret, Queen of Sicily. Trinacria: New York, 2017.
- Norwich, John Julius. The Kingdom in the Sun 1130-1194. Longman: London, 1970.
