= Ceremony of the Flags =

The Ceremony of the Flags (French: Cérémonie des drapeaux) (abbreviated as C of Fs) is a Canadian military music event usually held by unit of the Royal Canadian Navy. Queen Elizabeth II, Queen of Canada, had started it in 1965. The display originated from the Sunset Ceremony that was held after the introduction of the Canadian Flag on Parliament Hill in 1965. The ceremony is also derived from the historical Beating Retreat that originated in the United Kingdom and a military tattoo. The first ceremony was held in 1967 in honor of Canada's centennial year celebrations. On Feb 15 1967, local cadet units and the HMCS Carleton Band performed during the first ceremony on Parliament Hill. It was the first ever flag day. For the most part, the Royal Canadian Sea Cadets perform the ceremony annually, with the most prominent one being held at CSTC HMCS Quadra. In years past, naval youth cadet organizations from Hong Kong, Australia, Sweden, South Korea, and the United Kingdom have been participants. The minimum requirement to perform the ceremony is 30 by 60 metres. This ceremony is performed once each year (Feb 15) to honor the Canadian flags.

== Personnel ==
The personnel required to perform the ceremony are:

- Guard Commander
- Guard Officer
- National Flag Bearer
- Battery Officer
- Guides
- National Flag Escort
- Gun Commanders
- Provincial and Territorial Flag Bearers (13 petty officers, second class/sergeants)
- Guard of honour (48 leading seaman or able seaman/corporals or privates)
- Gun Crews (Between 20-32 per gun)
- Bands (one brass-reed band or one bugle band; 50 members for both)
- Signalman

This numbers around 250 cadets in attendance at the ceremony. The national and provincial/territorial flags are positioned at a six-pace interval to the rear of the guard, in the following order of precedence:

- Nunavut
- Yukon
- Alberta
- Prince Edward Island
- Manitoba
- Nova Scotia
- Ontario
- Canada
- Flag of the Canadian Armed Forces
- Quebec
- New Brunswick
- British Columbia
- Saskatchewan
- Newfoundland and Labrador
- Northwest Territories

== Sequence of events ==
The Ceremony of the Flags is divided into six phases as follows:

1. March On
2. Beating Retreat/Tattoo
3. Marchpast
4. Section Drill
5. Feu de joie
6. Salute to the Flags/Evening Hymn
7. Sunset (optional)
8. The March Off

=== Beating Retreat/Tattoo ===
Following the march on, one of the guns shall fire "The Evening Gun” as the signal to commence the ceremony. The drum section and the bugle band the march off in quick time, advancing 10 paces before countermarching and breaking into the slow time when passing through the bands. At the signal by the drum major, the drummers and buglers halt before the buglers turn inwards and play First Post.

=== Marchpast ===
Upon completion of the First Post, the guard commander orders guard to march in quick then, to which the guard and band step off together and the buglers to resume their original position within the band. The band marches toward the dais, make a right wheel and proceed directly toward the guard. Concurrently, the guard will pass through the ranks of the band before marching towards the direction of the dais. After the guard has passed through the band, the band will follow the route of the guard. They then march in both slow and quick time, with all the flags except the Canadian Flag being lowerd on the command of Eyes...Right! while in slow time.

=== Feu de Joie ===
The Feu de Joie is fired in accordance with Chapter 9 of the Canadian Forces Drill Manual.

=== Evening Hymn ===
After completion of the Feu de Joie, the guard is then ordered to stand at ease. The brass-reed band then plays an appropriate evening hymn. On completion of the hymn, the guard commander orders guard of honour to attention, followed by the order to fix bayonets.

=== Sunset Ceremony ===
After the guard has assumed the position of attention, the signalman, from his/her position at the base of the flag pole, reports the following to the guard commander: One Minute to Sunset, Sir! The lowering of the National Flag is then prepared. On completion of the shoulder arms, the bugler sounds Alert and the band commences to play the "Orchestrated Sunset". On the seventh measure of music, the bass drummer accentuates the beat on his drum, which is the signal for the guard commander to order guard to present arms. On the last movement of the present arms, the No. 1 gun commander fires one gun and the signalman commences to lower the National Flag. Upon completion of the music, the band plays O Canada followed by God Save the King.
