= Robert (son of William I of Sicily) =

Robert (1153/4–1159/60) was the second son of King William I of Sicily and his queen, Margaret of Navarre. He was about four or five years old when he was appointed Prince of Capua in 1157 or 1158. Prior to his accession, since 1144, his father had been Prince of Capua. Robert's Latin title, princeps Capuanorum, means literally "Prince of Capuans". He was the third Robert of Capua, after Robert I and Robert II. The latter, who had been deposed in 1135, returned in 1155–56 in an effort to reclaim his principality. He managed to control some territory, but was ultimately unsuccessful. The young Robert's rule in Capua can be traced in documents between September 1158 and May 1159, but he had died by February–March 1160, when his father was once again ruling Capua directly. Eventually, Robert's younger brother Henry was appointed Prince of Capua in May 1166.
