= Robertson =

Robertson may refer to:

== People ==
- Robertson (surname) (includes a list of people with this name)
- Robertson (given name)
- Clan Robertson, a Scottish clan
- Robertson, stage name of Belgian magician Étienne-Gaspard Robert (1763–1837)

== Places ==
=== Australia ===
- Division of Robertson, electoral district in the Australian House of Representatives, in New South Wales
- Electoral district of Robertson
- Robertson, New South Wales
- Robertson, Queensland
- Robertson Barracks, an Australian Army base near Darwin, Northern Territory

=== United States ===
- Robertson Boulevard (Los Angeles), California
- Robertson Gymnasium, University of California, Santa Barbara
- Robertson Field (Connecticut), a public airport
- Robertson County, Kentucky
- Robertson Field (North Dakota), a public airport
- Robertson Tunnel, Portland, Oregon, a light rail transit tunnel
- Robertson County, Tennessee
- Robertson, Texas
- Robertson County, Texas
- Robertson Stadium, University of Houston, Houston, Texas
- Robertson's Colony, Texas
- Robertson, Wyoming

=== Elsewhere ===
- Cape Robertson, Antarctica
- Cape Robertson, Greenland
- Robertson (crater), on the Moon
- Robertson, Western Cape, South Africa
- Robertson Island, Antarctica
- Robertson Islands, Antarctica
- Robertson Fjord, Greenland

== Other uses ==
- Robertson's, a UK brand of marmalades and jams
- Alexander Robertson & Sons, a Scottish boatbuilding company
- Robertson screwdriver, a square-shaped screwdriver
- Robertson Panel, commissioned by the CIA in 1952 to investigate unidentified flying objects
- Robertson Scholars Program, a joint program at Duke University and the University of North Carolina at Chapel Hill
- Robertson graph, in mathematics graph theory
- The Robertson Brothers, Australian singing trio
- Robertson College, a Canadian private career college
- Robertson's, a South African brand of spices

== See also ==
- Beverly Robertson (disambiguation)
- Roberts (disambiguation)
- Roberson (disambiguation)
- Robinson (disambiguation)
- Robson (disambiguation)
- Roberton (disambiguation)
- Justice Robertson (disambiguation)
