= Stadacona Band of the Royal Canadian Navy =

Canadian military band

- Musique Stadacona de la Marine royale canadienne
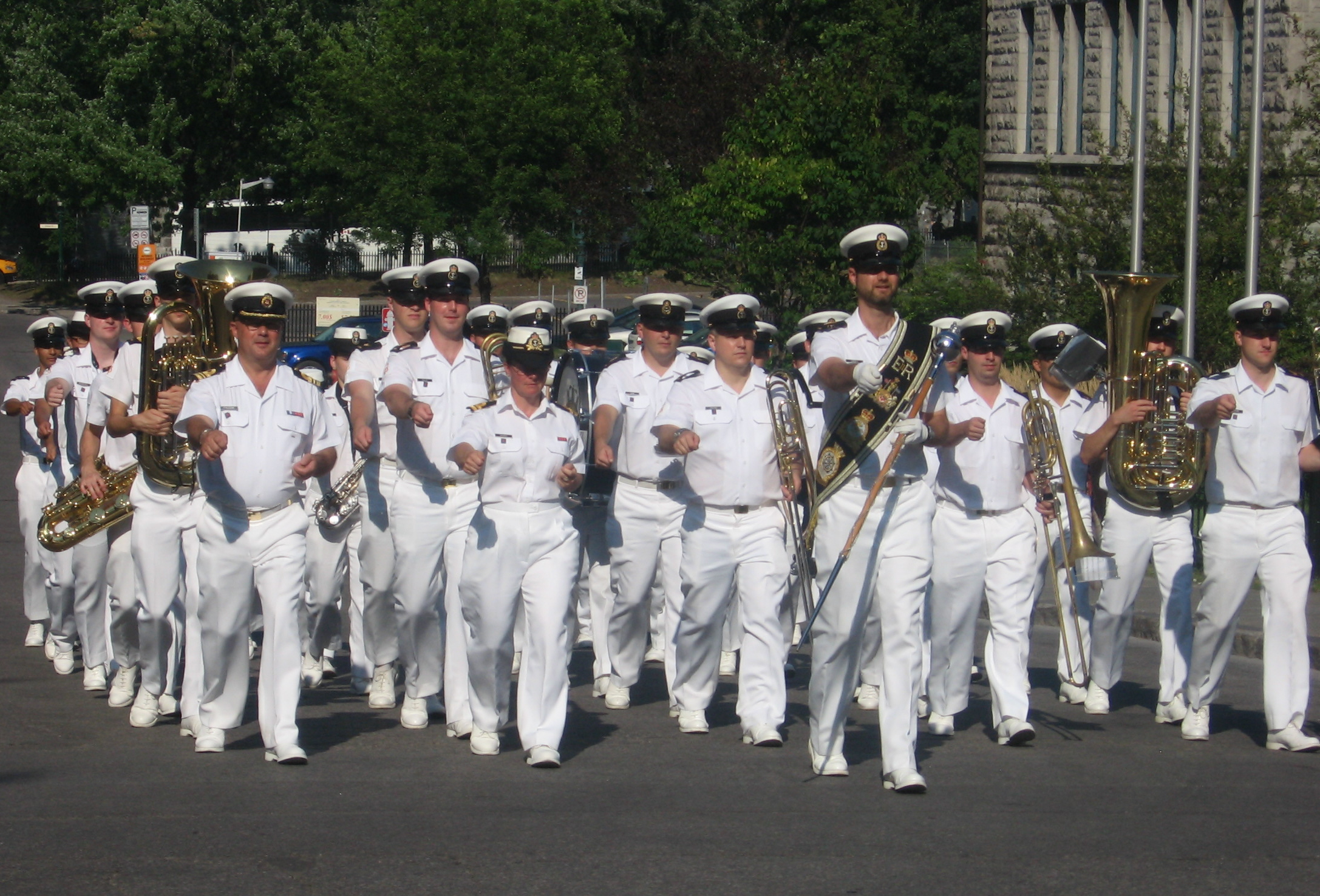
- Active: 1940-present
- Country: Canada
- Branch: Royal Canadian Navy
- Type: Military band
- Size: 35 members
- Part of: Maritime Forces Atlantic
- Headquarters: Halifax, Nova Scotia
- Website: www.canada.ca/en/navy/corporate/community-support/naval-bands/stadacona.html

Commanders
- Commanding Officer: Lieutenant (N) Jeff Campbell
- Notable commanders: William Gordon

The Stadacona Band of the Royal Canadian Navy is a military band based in Halifax, Nova Scotia. It serves as official military band of Maritime Forces Atlantic (MARLANT). It is one of six Regular Force military bands in the Canadian Forces. It provides musical accompaniment for ceremonial requirements of the East Coast Navy. The Stadacona Band usually performs at the Halifax dockyard to take part in the welcoming naval vessels. For over 75 years, the band's performances have been seen members of the royal family, the governor general of Canada, the prime minister of Canada, foreign heads of state, and Royal Canadian Navy officials. The band has provided music for all graduation activities in the area.

== History ==
In the summer of 1942 the original Stadacona band was divided into three parts, with one section going to HMCS St. Hyacinthe, another to HMCS Cornwallis and the remainder to HMCS Avalon. In October of that year another military band was formed for the ship. In 1943, part of the Stadacona band went to serve aboard HMCS Protector at Sydney, Nova Scotia. In 1967, the band was one of three naval bands represented in the 1967 Canadian Armed Forces Tattoo. The Stadacona band absorbed the Royal Canadian Artillery Band (Coastal) and members of the HMCS Cornwallis Band following the 1968 unification of the Canadian Armed Forces.

In September 2017, a member of the band composed what is now the service march of the Canadian Coast Guard.

== Directors of Music ==
- Jim Forde (July 1988–July 1993)
- Peter van der Horden (July 1993–May 2001)
- Gaetan Bouchard (May 2001–January 2006)
- Raymond Murray (January 2006–August 2016 )
- Patrice Arsenault (August 2016–August 2018)
- Brad Ritson (August 2018–July 2024)
- Jeff Campbell (July 2024-present)

== Ensembles ==
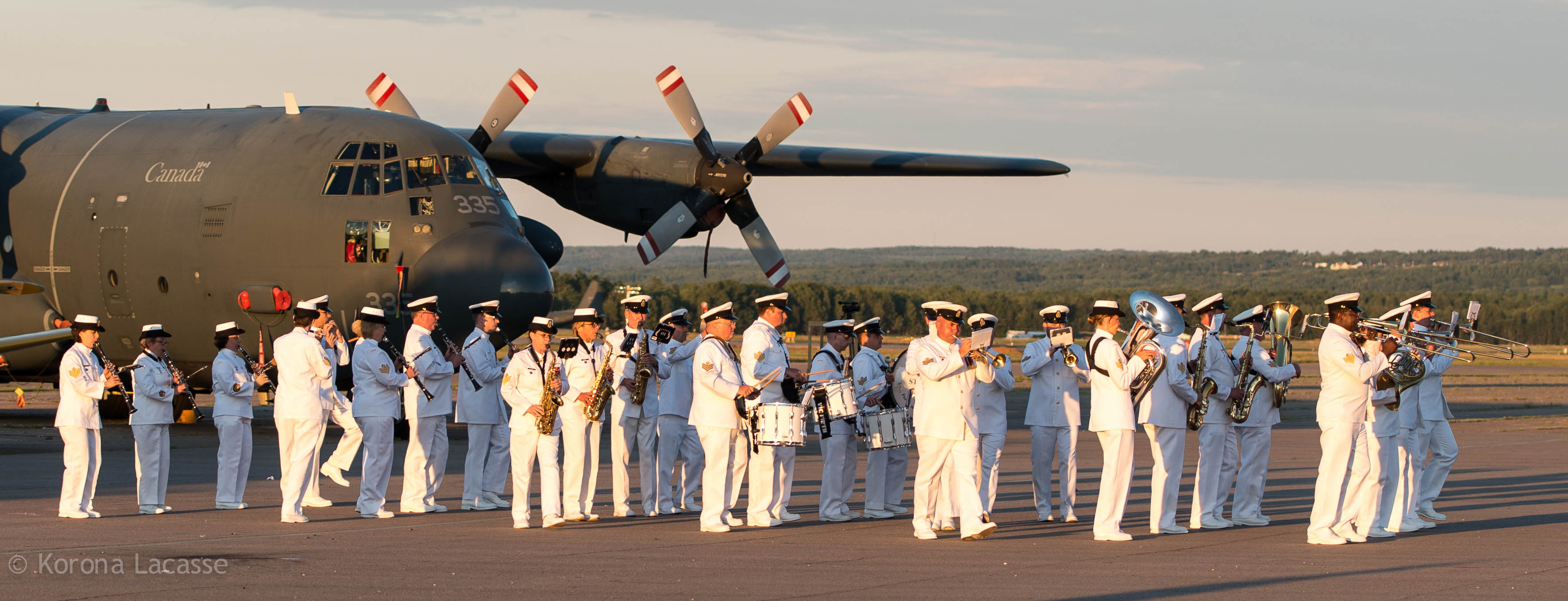
The band at a sunset ceremony in CFB Greenwood in August 2013.

- Parade Band
- Concert Band
- Big Band
- "Boarding Party" Rock Band
- Jazz Combo
- Brass Quintet
- Woodwind Quintet

A four-piece combo from the Stadacona Band toured Norway, Sweden, and Denmark in 1981.

== Links ==
- Official Website
- "Heart of Oak" (MP3) performed by the Stadacona Band
