= Burial sites of European monarchs and consorts =

Main burial sites of European kings include:

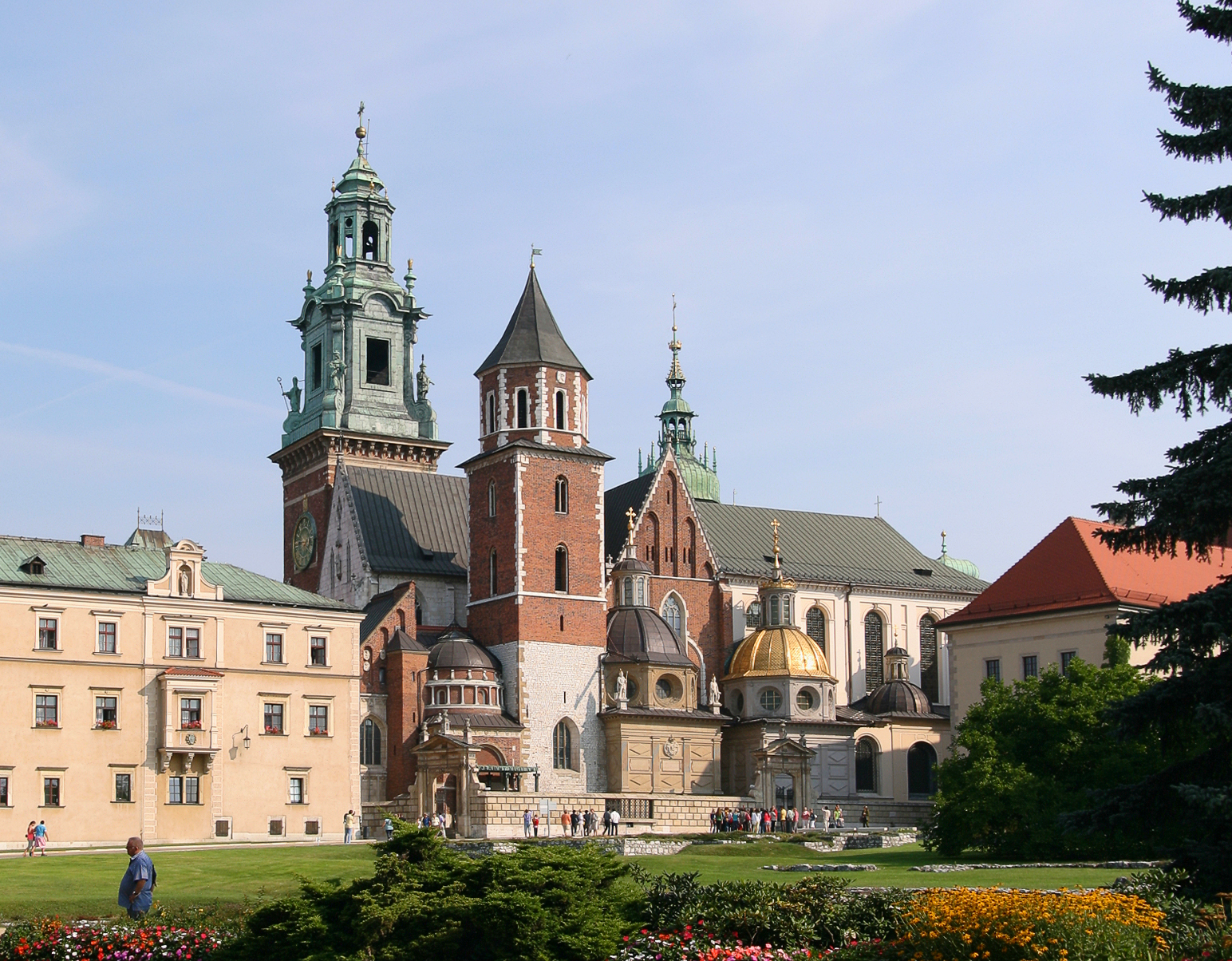

the Wawel Cathedral for kings of Poland

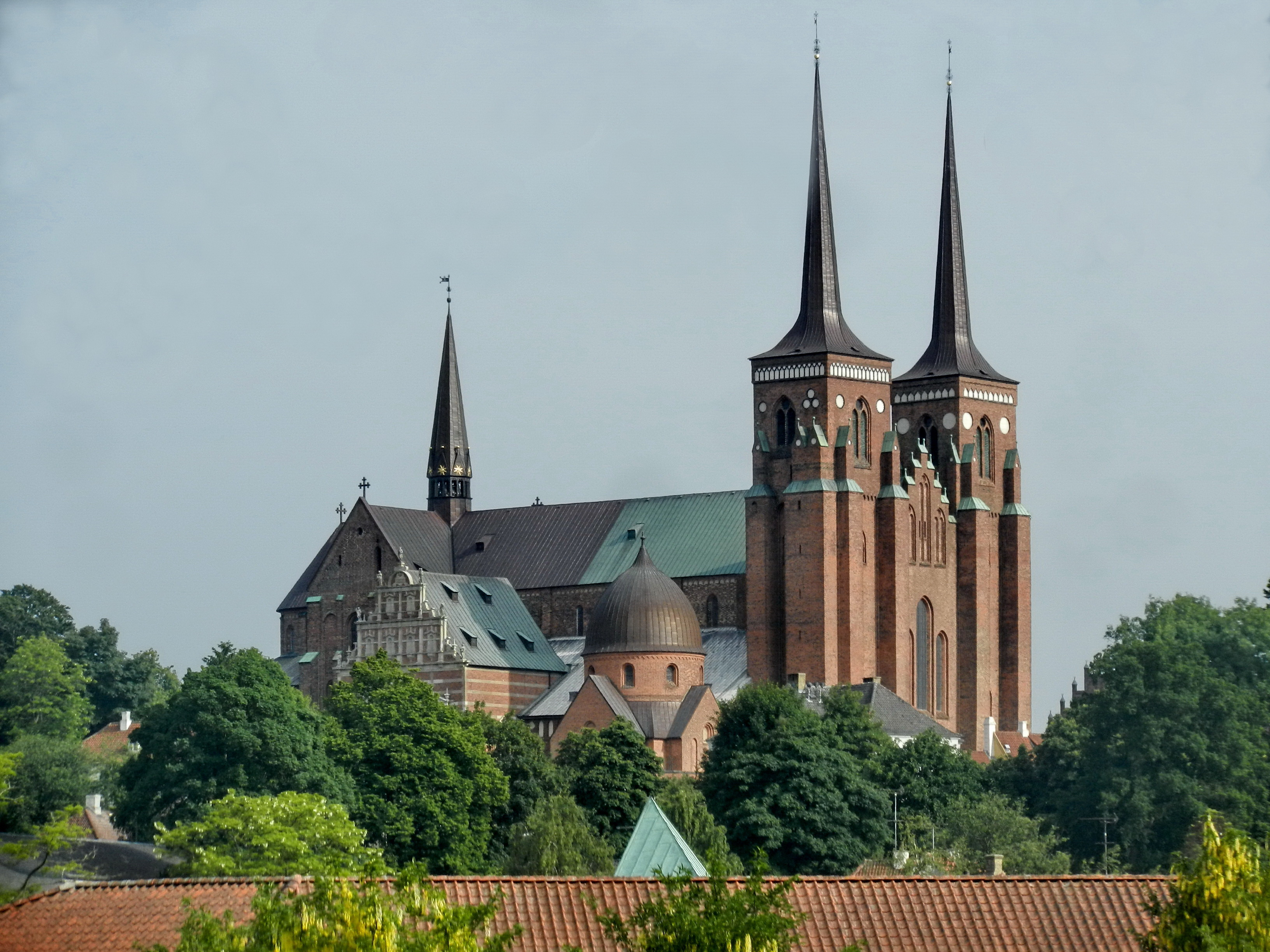

the Roskilde Cathedral for kings of Denmark

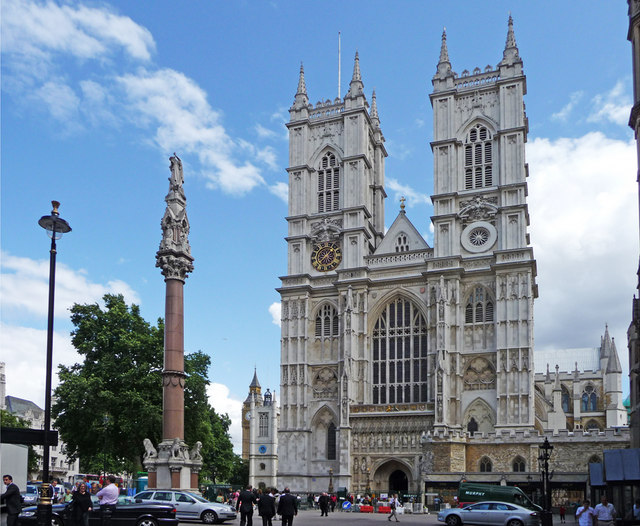

the Westminster Abbey for kings of England

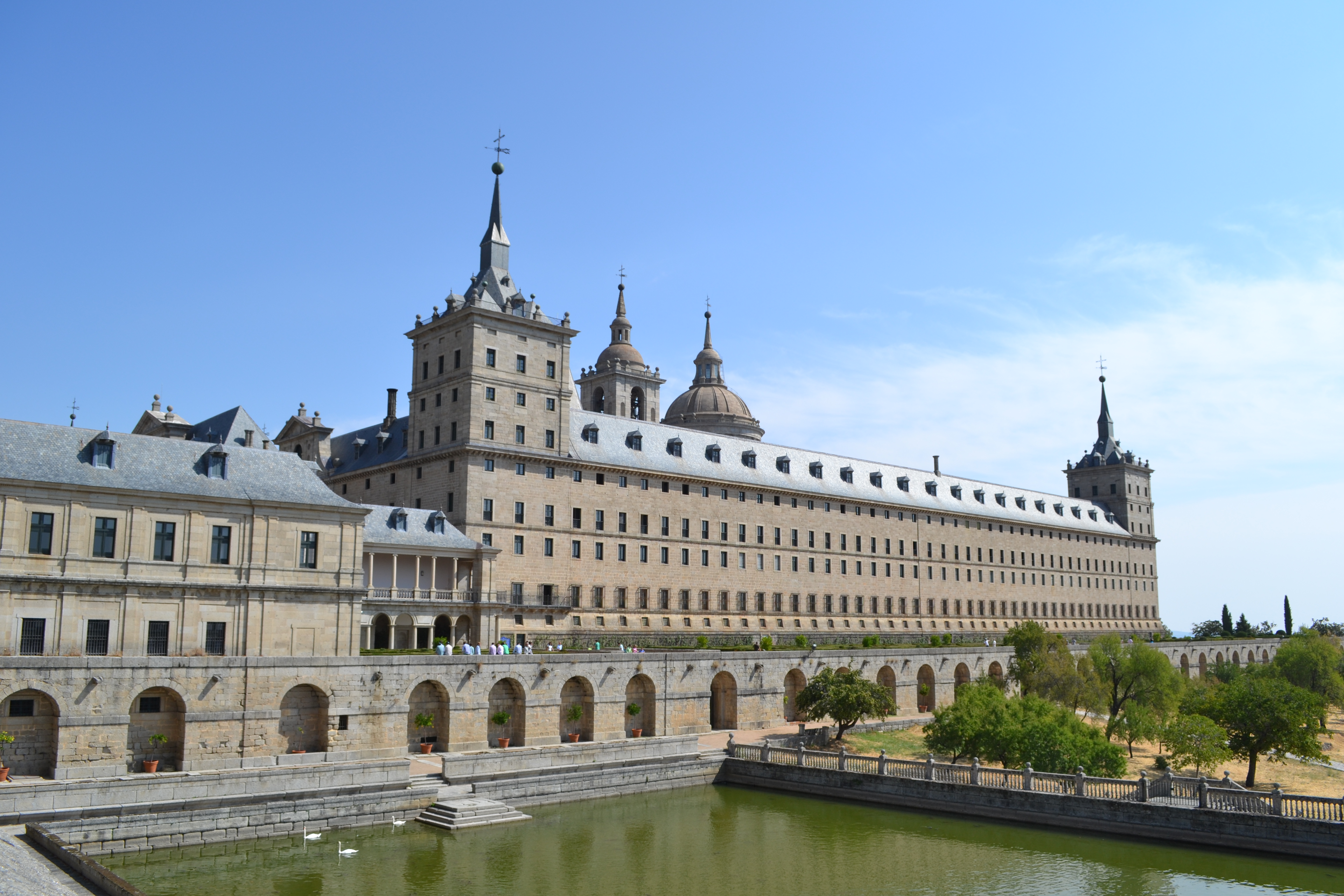

El Escorial for kings of Spain

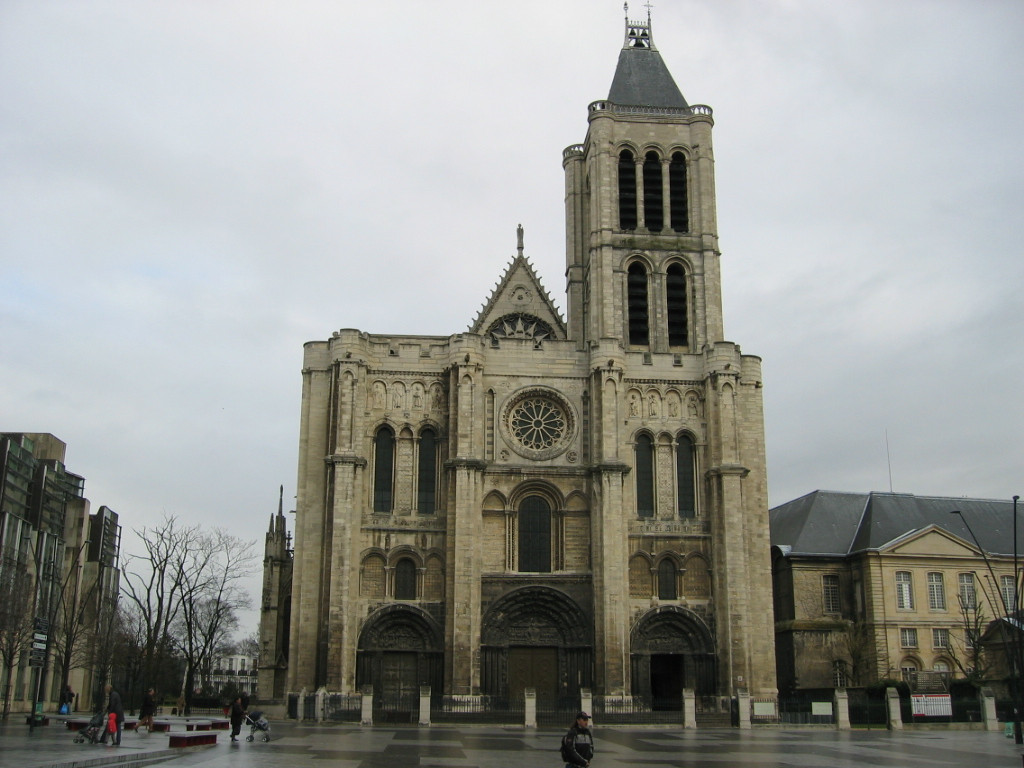

the Basilica of St Denis for kings of France

This list contains all European emperors, kings and regent princes and their consorts as well as well-known crown princes since the Middle Ages, whereas the lists are starting with either the beginning of the monarchy or with a change of the dynasty (e.g. England with the Norman king William the Conqueror, Spain with the unification of Castile and Aragon, Sweden with the Vasa dynasty, etc.). In addition, it contains the still-existing principalities of Monaco and Liechtenstein and the Grand-Duchy of Luxembourg.

== Albania ==
Kingdom from 1928 until 1943 (1939–1943 in personal union with Italy)

Name	Born-died	Burial site
King Zog I	1895–1961	Cimetière parisien in Thiais, Val-de-Marne, nearby Paris. Re-buried in November 2012 in the Mausoleum of the Albanian Royal Family in Tirana.
Geraldine Apponyi de Nagy-Appony	1915–2002	Mausoleum of the Albanian Royal Family in Tirana

== Austria ==
Empire under the Habsburg monarchy from 1804 until 1918. All emperors, with the exception of Charles I, were buried in the Imperial Crypt (Kaisergruft), at the Capuchin Church, in Vienna. Their hearts are buried in the Herzgruft (Crypt of the Hearts) at the St. Augustine Church at the Imperial Palace, in Vienna. Their viscera are buried in the Ducal Crypt at the Stephansdom, in Vienna.

Name	Born-died	Burial site
Emperor Francis I	1768–1835	Francis’ Vault in the Imperial Crypt in the Kapuzinerkirche in Vienna; Heart: Augustinerkirche
Elisabeth of Württemberg	1767–1790	Francis’ Vault in the Imperial Crypt in the Kapuzinerkirche in Vienna; Heart: Augustinerkirche
Maria Theresa of Naples and Sicily	1772–1807	Francis’ Vault in the Imperial Crypt in the Kapuzinerkirche in Vienna
Maria Ludovika of Austria-Este	1787–1816	Francis’ Vault in the Imperial Crypt in the Kapuzinerkirche in Vienna; Heart: Augustinerkirche
Caroline Augusta of Bavaria	1792–1873	Francis’ Vault in the Imperial Crypt in the Kapuzinerkirche in Vienna
Emperor Ferdinand I	1793–1875	Ferdinand's Vault in the Imperial Crypt in the Kapuzinerkirche in Vienna; Heart: Augustinerkirche
Maria Anna of Savoy	1803–1884	Ferdinand's Vault in the Imperial Crypt in the Kapuzinerkirche in Vienna
Emperor Francis Joseph I	1830–1916	Franz Joseph's Vault in the Imperial Crypt in the Kapuzinerkirche in Vienna
Elisabeth of Bavaria	1837–1898	Franz Joseph's Vault in the Imperial Crypt in the Kapuzinerkirche in Vienna
Crown Prince Rudolf	1858–1889	Franz Joseph's Vault in the Imperial Crypt in the Kapuzinerkirche in Vienna
Stephanie of Belgium	1864–1945	Pannonhalma Benedictine Archabbey, Hungary
Archduke Franz Ferdinand	1863–1914	Artstetten Castle, Lower Austria
Sophie, Duchess of Hohenberg	1868–1914	Artstetten Castle, Lower Austria
Emperor Charles I	1887–1922	Church of Nossa Senhora do Monte in Funchal (Madeira, Portugal); heart: Muri convent, Switzerland
Zita of Bourbon-Parma	1892–1989	The Crypt Chapel in the Imperial Crypt in the Kapuzinerkirche in Vienna; heart: Muri convent, Switzerland

== Bavaria ==
Kingdom from 1806 until 1918. The Bavarian kings of the house of Wittelsbach were buried in four churches in Munich, whereas the hearts used to be buried in Altötting.

Name	Born-died	Burial site
King Maximilian I	1756–1825	Crypt in the Theatinerkirche in Munich; heart in the Chapel of the Miraculous Image (Gnadenkapelle) in Altötting
Augusta Wilhelmine of Hesse-Darmstadt	1765–1796	Crypt in the Stadtkirche in Darmstadt
Caroline of Baden	1776–1841	Crypt in the Theatinerkirche in Munich; heart in the Chapel of the Miraculous Image (Gnadenkapelle) in Altötting
King Ludwig I	1786–1868	Side chapel in St. Boniface's Abbey in Munich; heart in the Chapel of the Miraculous Image (Gnadenkapelle) in Altötting
Therese of Saxe-Hildburghausen	1792–1854	Side chapel in St. Boniface's Abbey in Munich
King Maximilian II	1811–1864	Side chapel in Theatinerkirche in Munich; heart in the Chapel of the Miraculous Image (Gnadenkapelle) in Altötting
Marie of Prussia	1825–1889	Side chapel in Theatinerkirche; heart in the Chapel of the Miraculous Image (Gnadenkapelle) in Altötting
King Ludwig II	1845–1886	Crypt in the St. Michael's Church in Munich; heart in the Chapel of the Miraculous Image (Gnadenkapelle) in Altötting
King Otto I	1848–1916	Crypt in St. Michael's Church in Munich; heart in the Chapel of the Miraculous Image (Gnadenkapelle) in Altötting
Prince Regent Luitpold	1821–1912	Crypt in the Theatinerkirche in Munich; heart in the Chapel of the Miraculous Image (Gnadenkapelle) in Altötting
Auguste of Austria	1825–1864	Crypt in the Theatinerkirche in Munich; heart in the Chapel of the Miraculous Image (Gnadenkapelle) in Altötting
King Ludwig III	1845–1921	Crypt in the Cathedral of our Blessed Lady in Munich; heart in the Chapel of the Miraculous Image (Gnadenkapelle) in Altötting
Maria Theresia of Austria-Este	1849–1919	Crypt in the Cathedral of our Blessed Lady in Munich; heart in the Chapel of the Miraculous Image (Gnadenkapelle) in Altötting

== Belgium ==
Kingdom since 1830. All Belgian kings were buried in the royal burial place in Laeken.

Name	Born-died	Burial site
King Leopold I	1790–1865	Royal crypt in the Church of Our Lady in Laeken, Brussels
Charlotte Auguste of Wales	1796–1817	St George's Chapel, Windsor Castle
Louise of Orléans	1812–1850	Royal crypt in the Church of Our Lady in Laeken, Brussels
King Leopold II	1835–1909	Royal crypt in the Church of Our Lady in Laeken, Brussels
Marie Henriette of Austria	1836–1902	Royal crypt in the Church of Our Lady in Laeken, Brussels
Blanche Zélia Joséphine Delacroix	1883–1948	Père Lachaise Cemetery in Paris
King Albert I	1875–1934	Royal crypt in the Church of Our Lady in Laeken, Brussels
Elisabeth of Bavaria	1876–1965	Royal crypt in the Church of Our Lady in Laeken, Brussels
King Leopold III	1901–1983	Royal crypt in the Church of Our Lady in Laeken, Brussels
Astrid of Sweden	1905–1935	Royal crypt in the Church of Our Lady in Laeken, Brussels
Lilian Baels	1916–2002	Royal crypt in the Church of Our Lady in Laeken, Brussels
Prince Regent Charles	1903–1983	Royal crypt in the Church of Our Lady in Laeken, Brussels
King Baudouin I	1930–1993	Royal crypt in the Church of Our Lady in Laeken, Brussels
Fabiola de Mora y Aragón	1928–2014	Royal crypt in the Church of Our Lady in Laeken, Brussels

== Bohemia ==
Kingdom since 1198, as from 1526 in personal union with Austria.

Name	Born-died	Burial site
King Ottokar I	1155–1230	Saxon Chapel in St. Vitus Cathedral in Prague
Adelaide of Meissen	1160–1211	Meissen Cathedral
Constance of Hungary	1181–1240	Porta coeli Convent in Předklášteří, Southern Moravia
King Wenceslaus I	1205–1253	St Agnes convent in Prague
Kunigunde of Hohenstaufen	1200–1248	St Agnes convent in Prague
King Ottokar II	1233–1278	Saxon Chapel in St. Vitus Cathedral in Prague
Margaret of Austria	1204–1266	Lilienfeld Abbey, Lower Austria
Kunigunda of Halych	1246–1285	St Agnes convent in Prague
King Wenceslaus II	1271–1305	Zbraslav Monastery in Prague
Judith of Habsburg	1271–1297	Royal Crypt in St. Vitus Cathedral in Prague
Elizabeth Richeza of Poland	1286–1335	Cistercian convent in Brno
King Wenceslaus III	1289–1306	Zbraslav Monastery in Prague
Viola of Teschen	1290–1317	Rožmberk Abbey nearby Vyšší Brod, Southern Bohemia
King Rudolph I	1282–1307	Royal Crypt in St. Vitus Cathedral in Prague
Blanche of France	1285–1306	Minoritenkirche in Vienna
Elisabeth Richeza of Poland	1286–1335	Cistercian convent in Brno
King Henry of Carinthia	1265–1335	Collegiate Church in Stams in Tirol, Austria
Anne of Bohemia	1290–1313	Carinthia
Adelaide of Brunswick-Lüneburg	1300–1320	?
Beatrice of Savoy	1310–1331	?
King John I	1296–1346	first in the Altmünster abbey in Luxembourg; since 1946 in the Notre-Dame Cathedral in Luxembourg
Elisabeth of Bohemia	1292–1330	Zbraslav Monastery in Prague
Beatrice of Bourbon	1320–1383	first in the basilica of St-Denis nearby Paris, then in the Notre-Dame Cathedral in Luxembourg
Emperor Charles IV	1316–1378	Royal Crypt in St. Vitus Cathedral in Prague
Blanche of Valois	1317–1348	Royal Crypt in St. Vitus Cathedral in Prague
Anne of Bavaria	1329–1353	Royal Crypt in St. Vitus Cathedral in Prague
Anna von Schweidnitz	1339–1362	Royal Crypt in St. Vitus Cathedral in Prague
Elizabeth of Pomerania	1347–1393	Royal Crypt in St. Vitus Cathedral in Prague
King Wenceslaus	1361–1419	Royal Crypt in St. Vitus Cathedral in Prague
Joanna of Bavaria	1356–1386	Royal Crypt in St. Vitus Cathedral in Prague
Sophia of Bavaria	1376–1425	St Martins' Cathedral in Bratislava (grave does no longer exist)
Emperor Sigismund	1368–1437	Oradea Cathedral, Romania
Mary of Hungary	1370–1395	Oradea Cathedral, Romania
Barbara of Cilli	1391–1451	Royal Crypt in St. Vitus Cathedral in Prague
King Albert II	1397–1439	Székesfehérvár Basilica, Hungary
Elisabeth of Bohemia	1409–1442	Székesfehérvár Basilica, Hungary
King Ladislas the Posthumous	1440–1457	Royal Crypt in St. Vitus Cathedral in Prague
George of Poděbrady	1420–1471	Royal Crypt in St. Vitus Cathedral in Prague
Kunigunde of Sternberg	1425–1449	Parish church at Poděbrady, Central Bohemia
Joanna of Rožmitál	?-1475	?
King Vladislaus II	1456–1516	Székesfehérvár Basilica, Hungary
Barbara of Brandenburg	1464–1515	?
Beatrice of Naples	1457–1508	?
Anne of Foix-Candale	1469–1506	Székesfehérvár Basilica, Hungary
King Matthias Corvinus	1443–1490	Székesfehérvár Basilica, Hungary
Beatrice of Naples	1457–1508	S. Pietro Abbey in Naples
King Louis II	1506–1526	Székesfehérvár Basilica, Hungary
Mary of Austria	1505–1558	9th chapel of the pantheon of the infants in the Monastery of San Lorenzo El Real in El Escorial

== Bulgaria ==
Empire from the 7th century to 1018, 1185 to 15th century. Kingdom from 1908 until 1945.

Name	Born-died	Burial site
Emperor Samuil	d. 1014	Church of St Achillios in Lake Prespa, Greece
Emperor Kaloyan	1168/1169-1207	SS. Forty Martyrs Church in Veliko Tarnovo
Emperor Michael Shishman	d. 1330	Church of St George in Staro Nagoricane, Macedonia
Prince Alexander I	1856–1893	Battenberg Mausoleum in Sofia
Johanna Loisinger, Countess of Hartenau	1865–1951	St. Leonhard Cemetery in Graz, Austria
King Ferdinand I	1861–1948	St Augustin Church in Coburg, Germany
Marie Louise of Bourbon-Parma	1870–1899	Catholic Cathedral of St Louis of France in Plovdiv
Eleonore Reuss of Köstritz	1860–1917	Boyana Church in Sofia
King Boris III	1894–1943	Heart in the Rila Monastery; it is uncertain what happened to the body
Giovanna of Italy	1907–2000	Basilica of San Francesco d'Assisi in Assisi, Italy

== Croatia ==
Kingdom from 1941 until 1943

Name	Born-died	Burial site
King Tomislav II	1900–1948	Basilica di Superga in Turin
Irene of Greece	1904–1974	Basilica di Superga in Turin

== Denmark ==
One of the oldest kingdoms in Europe, established in the 11th century. The lists starts with the dynasty of Folkung in 1376. For the last 500 years, almost all monarchs have been interred in Roskilde Cathedral. Many earlier monarchs were interred in the Church of St. Bendt in Ringsted, and a few in Sorø monastery church.

Name	Born-died	Burial site
King Gorm the Old	908/18-958	Jelling
Thyra	?-935	Jelling
King Harald I Bluetooth	935–985/6	Roskilde Cathedral
King Sweyn Forkbeard	960–1014	in England, later Roskilde Cathedral
King Harald II	?–1018	?
King Cnut the Great	985/95–1035	Winchester Cathedral
Emma of Normandy	985–1052	Winchester Cathedral
King Canute III	1020–1042	Winchester Cathedral
King Sweyn II	1019–1074/6	Roskilde Cathedral
Gyda of Sweden	?–1048/49	Gudhem Convent
King Harald III	1040–1080	Dalby Abbey
King Canute IV	1042–1086	St. Canute's Cathedral
King Olaf I	1050–1095	?
King Eric I	1060–1103	Paphos, Cyprus
Boedil Thurgotsdatter	?–1103	St. Mary's Church, Joseph's Valley, Mount of Olives, Jerusalem
King Niels	1065–1134	?
Margaret Fredkulla	1080s–1130	Roskilde Cathedral
King Eric II	1090–1137	Ribe Cathedral
King Eric III	1125–1157	St. Canute's Abbey, Odense
King Sweyn III	1120–1146	first at Gradehede, then Viborg Cathedral
King Canute V	1129–1157	?Roskilde
Helena of Sweden	1130s – fl. 1158	Vreta Abbey
King Valdemar I	1131–1182	Ringsted Abbey
Sophia of Minsk	1140–1198	Ringsted Abbey
King Canute VI	1163–1202	Ringsted Abbey
Gertrude of Bavaria	1152/55-1197	Wå Gårds Harde?
King Valdemar II	1170–1241	Ringsted Abbey
Dagmar of Bohemia	1186–1212/3	Ringsted Abbey
Berengaria of Portugal	1190s–1221	Ringsted Abbey
junior-King Valdemar the Young	1209–1231	Ringsted Abbey
Eleanor of Portugal	1211–1231	Ringsted Abbey
King Eric IV	1216–1250	Ringsted Abbey
King Abel	1218–1252	first at Schleswig Cathedral, then in a soggy grave outside Gottorf Castle
Matilda of Holstein	1220/25–1288	Varnhem Abbey in Sweden
King Christopher I	1219–1259	Ribe Cathedral
Margaret Sambiria	1230?–1282	Doberan Abbey
King Eric V	1249–1286	Viborg Cathedral
Agnes of Brandenburg	?–1304	Ringsted Abbey
King Eric VI	1274–1319	Ringsted Abbey
Ingeborg Magnusdotter of Sweden	1277–1319	Ringsted Abbey
King Christopher II	1276–1332	Convent Church at Sorø
Euphemia of Pomerania	1285–1330	Convent Church at Sorø
King Valdemar IV	1320–1375	first at Vordingborg Castle, then Convent Church at Sorø
Helvig of Schleswig	?-1374	Esrum Abbey
King Olav II	1370–1387	Convent Church at Sorø
Queen Margrethe I	1353–1412	first in the Convent Church at Sorø, then in the Roskilde Cathedral
King Haakon VI of Norway	1341–1380	St Mary Church in Oslo
King Eric VII	1382–1459	Our Lady Church at Darlowo, Poland
Philippa of England	1394–1430	Convent Church at Vadstena nearby Lidköping, Sweden
King Christopher III	1416–1458	Roskilde Cathedral
King Christian I	1426–1481	Roskilde Cathedral
Dorothea of Brandenburg	1430–1495	Roskilde Cathedral
King Hans	1455–1513	first in Gråbrødre Church, then in Saint Canute's Cathedral
Christina of Saxony	1461–1521	first in Gråbrødre Church, then in Saint Canute's Cathedral in Odense
King Christian II	1481–1552	first in Gråbrødre Church, then in Saint Canute's Cathedral in Odense
Isabella of Austria	1501–1525	first at St Peter Church in Gent, then in Saint Canute's Cathedral in Odense
King Frederik I	1471–1533	St Peter's Cathedral in Schleswig
Anna of Brandenburg	1487–1514	Convent Church in Bornesholm
Sophie of Pomerania	1498–1568	St Peter's Cathedral in Schleswig
King Christian III	1503–1559	Roskilde Cathedral
Dorothea of Saxe-Lauenburg	1511–1571	Roskilde Cathedral
King Frederik II	1534–1588	Roskilde Cathedral
Sofie of Mecklenburg-Schwerin	1557–1631	Roskilde Cathedral
King Christian IV	1577–1648	Roskilde Cathedral
Anne Catherine of Brandenburg	1575–1612	Roskilde Cathedral
Kirsten Munk	1598–1658	Saint Canute's Cathedral in Odense
King Frederik III	1609–1670	Roskilde Cathedral
Sophie Amalie of Brunswick-Calenberg	1628–1685	Roskilde Cathedral
King Christian V	1646–1699	Roskilde Cathedral
Charlotte Amalie of Hesse-Kassel	1650–1714	Roskilde Cathedral
King Frederik IV	1671–1730	Roskilde Cathedral
Louise of Mecklenburg-Güstrow	1667–1721	Roskilde Cathedral
Anne Sophie Reventlow	1693–1743	Roskilde Cathedral
King Christian VI	1699–1746	Roskilde Cathedral
Sophie Magdalene of Brandenburg-Kulmbach	1700–1770	Roskilde Cathedral
King Frederik V	1723–1766	Roskilde Cathedral
Louise of Great Britain	1724–1751	Roskilde Cathedral
Juliana Maria of Brunswick-Wolfenbüttel	1729–1796	Roskilde Cathedral
King Christian VII	1749–1808	Roskilde Cathedral
Caroline Matilda of Great Britain	1751–1775	Stadtkirche St. Marien in Celle
King Frederik VI	1768–1839	Roskilde Cathedral
Marie of Hesse-Kassel	1767–1852	Roskilde Cathedral
King Christian VIII	1786–1848	Roskilde Cathedral
Charlotte of Mecklenburg	1784–1840	Campo Santo Teutonico in Vatican City
Caroline Amalie of Augustenburg	1796–1881	Roskilde Cathedral
King Frederik VII	1808–1863	Roskilde Cathedral
Vilhelmine of Denmark	1808–1891	Mausoleum in Glücksburg cemetery
Caroline of Mecklenburg-Strelitz	1821–1876	Old Crypt at Johanniterkirche in Mirow
Louise Christine Rasmussen	1815–1874	in the park of Jægerspris Palace nearby Frederikssund
King Christian IX	1818–1906	Roskilde Cathedral
Louise of Hesse-Kassel	1817–1898	Roskilde Cathedral
King Frederik VIII	1843–1912	Roskilde Cathedral
Louise of Sweden	1851–1926	Roskilde Cathedral
King Christian X	1870–1947	Roskilde Cathedral
Alexandrine of Mecklenburg-Schwerin	1879–1952	Roskilde Cathedral
King Frederik IX	1899–1972	Roskilde Cathedral
Ingrid of Sweden	1910–2000	Roskilde Cathedral
Henri de Laborde de Monpezat	1934–2018	Ashes in garden of Fredensborg Palace

== England ==
See also Great Britain

Kingdom since the 9th century. The lists starts with the dynasty of the Normans in 1066. For a long period, Westminster Abbey was the most important burial place of the English monarchs, whereas early kings were also interred in other parts of England and in their French territories of Anjou and the Normandy.

Name	Born-died	Burial site
King William I	1028–1087	Church of Saint-Étienne in Caen
Matilda of Flanders	1031–1083	Church of Saint-Trinité in Caen
King William II	1060–1100	Winchester Cathedral
King Henry I	1068–1135	Reading Abbey
Matilda of Scotland	1069–1118	Westminster Abbey in London
Adeliza of Louvain	1104–1151	Abbey church in Affligem, Belgium
King Stephen	1096–1154	Faversham Abbey
Matilda of Boulogne	1103–1152	Faversham Abbey
Empress Matilda	1102–1167	first in the Collegiate Church of Bec, then in Rouen Cathedral
Henry V, Holy Roman Emperor	1086–1125	Speyer Cathedral
Geoffrey V, Count of Anjou	1113–1151	Cathedral of Le Mans
King Henry II	1133–1189	Fontevraud Abbey
Eleanor of Aquitaine	1122–1204	Fontevraud Abbey
Henry the Young King	1155–1183	Rouen Cathedral
Margaret of France	1158–1197	Crusader Cathedral of Tyre
King Richard I	1157–1199	Fontevraud Abbey
Berengaria of Navarre	1163–1230	Cathedral of Le Mans
King John	1166–1216	Worcester Cathedral
Isabella, Countess of Gloucester	1176–1217	Canterbury Cathedral
Isabella of Angoulême	1188–1246	Fontevrault Abbey
King Henry III	1207–1272	Confessor's Chapel at Westminster Abbey in London
Eleanor of Provence	1217–1291	Abbey of St. Mary and St. Melor in Amesbury
King Edward I	1239–1307	Confessor's Chapel at Westminster Abbey in London
Eleanor of Castile	1241–1290	Confessor's Chapel at Westminster Abbey in London
Margaret of France	1282–1317	Greyfriar's Church in Greenwich
King Edward II	1284–1327	Gloucester Cathedral
Isabella of France	1292–1358	Grey Friars Church in Newgate, London
King Edward III	1312–1377	Confessor's Chapel at Westminster Abbey in London
Philippa of Hainault	1311–1369	Confessor's Chapel at Westminster Abbey in London
King Richard II	1367–1400	Confessor's Chapel at Westminster Abbey in London
Anne of Bohemia	1366–1394	Confessor's Chapel at Westminster Abbey in London
Isabella of Valois	1389–1409	first at St-Saumer in Blois, then in the Convent des Céléstins in Paris
King Henry IV	1366–1413	Canterbury Cathedral
Mary de Bohun	1369–1394	Trinity Hospital in Leicester
Joanna of Navarre	1370–1437	Canterbury Cathedral
King Henry V	1387–1422	Confessor's Chapel at Westminster Abbey in London
Catherine of Valois	1401–1437	Confessor's Chapel at Westminster Abbey in London
King Henry VI	1421–1471	St George's Chapel, Windsor Castle
Margaret of Anjou	1429–1482	Cathedral of Angers
King Edward IV	1442–1483	St George's Chapel, Windsor Castle
Elizabeth Woodville	1437–1492	St George's Chapel, Windsor Castle
King Edward V	1470–1483	Henry VII's Chapel at Westminster Abbey in London
King Richard III	1452–1485	Leicester Cathedral
Anne Neville	1456–1485	Henry VII's Chapel at Westminster Abbey in London
King Henry VII	1457–1509	Henry VII's Chapel at Westminster Abbey in London
Elizabeth of York	1466–1503	Henry VII's Chapel at Westminster Abbey in London
King Henry VIII	1491–1547	St George's Chapel, Windsor Castle
Catherine of Aragon	1485–1536	Peterborough Cathedral
Anne Boleyn	1501–1536	St Peter ad Vincula in the Tower of London
Jane Seymour	1505–1537	St George's Chapel, Windsor Castle
Anne of Cleves	1515–1557	Niche in the Sanctuary at Westminster Abbey in London
Catherine Howard	1520–1542	St Peter ad Vincula in the Tower of London
Catherine Parr	1512–1548	Sudeley Castle
King Edward VI	1537–1553	Henry VII's Chapel at Westminster Abbey in London
Queen Jane (Lady Jane Grey)	1537–1554	St Peter ad Vincula in the Tower of London
Lord Guildford Dudley	1536–1554	St Peter ad Vincula in the Tower of London
Queen Mary I	1516–1558	Henry VII's Chapel at Westminster Abbey in London
Philip II of Spain	1527–1598	Pantheon of the Kings in the Monastery of San Lorenzo El Real in El Escorial
Queen Elizabeth I	1533–1603	Henry VII's Chapel at Westminster Abbey in London

== Etruria ==
Kingdom from 1801 until 1807 (covered the territory of the former grand-duchy of Tuscany)

Name	Born-died	Burial site
King Louis I	1773–1803	7th Chapel of the Pantheon of the Infants in the Monastery of San Lorenzo El Real in El Escorial
Maria Louisa of Spain	1782–1824	7th Chapel of the Pantheon of the Infants in the Monastery of San Lorenzo El Real in El Escorial
King Charles Louis	1799–1883	Tenuta Reale in Viareggio nearby Lucca
Maria Teresa of Savoy	1803–1879	Campo Verano cemetery in Rome

== Finland ==
Was briefly an independent kingdom from 1918 to 1919.

Name	Born-died	Burial site
King Fredrik Kaarle	1868–1940	Schloss Friedrichshof, Kronberg im Taunus
Margaret of Prussia	1872–1954	Schloss Friedrichshof, Kronberg im Taunus

== France ==
Kingdom since 814. Burial site of the French royal family is the Saint-Denis Basilica, where most of the kings were buried. The burial place of the Bonaparte family is the Imperial Chapel of Ajaccio, but the two emperors were interred elsewhere.

Name	Born-died	Burial site
King Childeric I	440–481	Saint-Brice in Tournai
King Clovis I	466–511	Saint Denis Basilica nearby Paris
King Theuderic I	485–534	Metz
King Childebert I	496–558	Saint-Germain-des-Prés nearby Paris, later moved to Saint Denis Basilica nearby Paris
King Chlothar I	498–561	Saint-Médard Basilica in Soissons
Aregund	515–573	Saint Denis Basilica nearby Paris
King Charibert I	519–567	Saint-Germain-des-Prés nearby Paris
King Sigebert I	535–575	Saint-Médard Basilica in Soissons
Brunhilda of Austrasia	543–613	Saint-Martin in Autun
King Chilperic I	539–584	Saint-Germain-des-Prés nearby Paris
Fredegund	543–597	Saint-Germain-des-Prés nearby Paris, later moved to Saint Denis Basilica nearby Paris
King Guntram	532–592	Saint-Marcel Basilica near Chalon-sur-Saône
King Chlothar II	584–629	St Vincent in Paris
Haldetrude	575/594-604/629	Saint-Pierre in Rouen
Bertrude	582–619	Saint-Pierre in Rouen
Sichilde	590–627	Saint-Pierre in Rouen?
King Dagobert I	603–639	Saint Denis Basilica nearby Paris
King Charibert II	608–632	Basilica of Saint-Romain at Blaye
King Sigebert III	630–656	cathedral at Nancy
King Clovis II	635–655	Saint Denis Basilica nearby Paris
Balthild of Chelles	626–680	Abbey of Chelles outside Paris
King Chlothar III	652–673	Saint Denis Basilica nearby Paris
King Childeric II	653–675	Saint-Germain-des-Prés, near Paris
Bilichild of Austrasia	654–675	Saint-Germain-des-Prés, near Paris
King Childebert III	670/683–711	church of St Stephen at Choisy-au-Bac, near Compiègne
King Chilperic II	672–721	Noyon
King Pepin	714–768	Saint Denis Basilica nearby Paris
Bertrada of Laon	719–783	Saint Denis Basilica nearby Paris
King Charlemagne	742–814	Aachen Cathedral in Aachen, Germany
Desiderata of the Lombards	?–776	?
Hildegard of the Vinzgau	758–783	St. Arnulf Church in Metz
Fastrada of Franconia	765–794	St. Alban Abbey nearby Mainz
Luitgard of Sundgau	?-800	St. Martin in Tours
King Louis I	778–840	St. Arnulf Church in Metz
Ermengarde of Hesbaye	780–818	Angers
Judith of Bavaria	801–843	St. Martin in Tours
King Charles II	823–877	Saint Denis Basilica nearby Paris
Ermentrude of Orléans	830–869	Saint Denis Basilica nearby Paris
Richilde of Provence	845–910	?
King Louis II	846–879	Abbey Church St. Corneille in Compiègne
Ansgarde of Burgundy	826–?	?
Adelaide of Paris	850–901	Saint-Corneille Abbey, Compiègne
King Louis III	863–882	Saint Denis Basilica nearby Paris
King Carloman II	866–884	Saint Denis Basilica nearby Paris
King Charles III	839–888	Reichenau Abbey in Mittelzell on the island of Reichenau
Richardis	850–901	Andlau convent in Alsace
King Odo	856–898	Saint Denis Basilica nearby Paris
King Charles III	879–929	St-Fursy in Péronne
Frederuna	887–917	St. Remi-Basilica in Reims
Eadgifu of Wessex	902–955	Saint-Médard in Soissons
King Robert I	866–923	?
Adelis of Maine	?	?
Beatrice of Vermandois	870–931	?
King Rudolph	890–936	Sainte-Colombe Abbey in Sens
Emma of France	894–934	?
King Louis IV	920–954	Saint Rémi Basilica in Reims
Gerberga of Saxony	919–984	Saint Rémi Basilica in Reims
King Lothair I	941–986	Saint Rémi Basilica in Reims
Emma of Italy	948–?	?
King Louis V	966–987	Abbey Church St. Corneille in Compiègne
Adelaide-Blanche of Anjou	947–1026	Convent of Montmajour nearby Arles
King Hugh	939–996	Saint Denis Basilica nearby Paris
Adelaide of Aquitaine	945–1004	Convent of St-Frambault in Senlis
King Robert II	972–1031	Saint Denis Basilica nearby Paris
Rozala of Italy	945–1003	Ghent
Bertha of Burgundy	967–1016	?
Constance of Arles	973–1032	Saint Denis Basilica nearby Paris
King Hugh II	1007–1025	St. Corneille Abbey in Compiègne
King Henry I	1008–1060	Saint Denis Basilica nearby Paris
Matilda of Franconia	?-1034	Worms Cathedral
Matilda of Frisia	?-1044	Saint Denis Basilica nearby Paris
Anne of Kiev	1036–1076	Cistercian Church of La Ferté Abbey
King Philip I	1052–1108	Collegiate Church of Saint-Benoît-sur-Loire
Bertha of Holland	1055–1093	?
Bertrade of Montfort	1070–1117	Royal Priory of Haute-Bruyère
King Louis VI	1081–1137	Saint Denis Basilica nearby Paris
Lucienne of Rochefort	1088–1137	?
Adelaide of Maurienne	1092–1154	Montmartre convent
King Philip	1116–1131	Saint Denis Basilica nearby Paris
King Louis VII	1120–1180	Nôtre Dame-de-Barbeau in Melun
Eleanor of Aquitaine	1122–1204	Fontevraud Abbey
Constance of Castile	1140–1160	Saint Denis Basilica nearby Paris
Adela of Champagne	1140–1206	Pontigny Abbey
King Philip II Augustus	1165–1223	Saint Denis Basilica nearby Paris
Isabella of Hainault	1170–1190	Notre Dame de Paris
Ingeborg of Denmark	1175–1236	St. Jean-sur-l'Isle
Agnes of Merania	1180–1201	Château Poissy
King Louis VIII	1187–1226	Saint Denis Basilica nearby Paris
Blanche of Castile	1188–1252	first in the Cistercian Abbey Maubuisson nearby Pontoise, then in Saint Denis Basilica nearby Paris; heart: Lys Abbey nearby Melun
King Louis IX	1214–1270	Saint Denis Basilica nearby Paris and Monreale Cathedral in Sicily (Italy)
Margaret of Provence	1221–1295	Saint Denis Basilica nearby Paris
King Philip III	1245–1285	Saint Denis Basilica nearby Paris
Isabella of Aragon	1247–1271	Saint Denis Basilica nearby Paris
Maria of Brabant	1254–1322	Convent Church des Cordeliers in Paris
King Philip IV	1268–1314	Saint Denis Basilica nearby Paris
Joan I of Navarre	1273–1305	Convent Church des Cordeliers in Paris
King Louis X	1289–1316	Saint Denis Basilica nearby Paris
Margaret of Burgundy	1290–1315	Église des Frères Gris in Vernon
Clementia of Hungary	1293–1328	St-Jacques in Paris
King John I	1316–1316	Saint Denis Basilica nearby Paris
King Philip V	1293–1322	Saint Denis Basilica nearby Paris
Joan II, Countess of Burgundy	1291–1330	Convent Church des Cordeliers in Paris
King Charles IV	1294–1328	Saint Denis Basilica nearby Paris
Blanche of Burgundy	1296–1326	Cistercian convent Maubuisson in Saint-Ouen-l'Aumône
Marie de Luxembourg	1305–1324	Dominican Church in Montargis
Joan of Évreux	1310–1371	Saint Denis Basilica nearby Paris
King Philip VI	1293–1350	Saint Denis Basilica nearby Paris
Joan of Burgundy	1293–1349	Saint Denis Basilica nearby Paris
Blanche of Navarre	1333–1398	Saint Denis Basilica nearby Paris
King John II	1319–1364	Saint Denis Basilica nearby Paris
Bonne of Luxembourg	1315–1349	Maubuisson Abbey
Joan I, Countess of Auvergne	1326–1360	Saint Denis Basilica nearby Paris
King Charles V	1338–1380	Saint Denis Basilica nearby Paris
Joanna of Bourbon	1338–1378	Saint Denis Basilica nearby Paris
King Charles VI	1368–1422	Saint Denis Basilica nearby Paris
Isabeau of Bavaria	1371–1435	Saint Denis Basilica nearby Paris
King Charles VII	1403–1461	Saint Denis Basilica nearby Paris
Marie of Anjou	1404–1463	Saint Denis Basilica nearby Paris
King Louis XI	1423–1483	Basilica Notre-Dame in Cléry-Saint-André nearby Orléans
Margaret of Scotland	1424–1445	St. Laon-de-Thouars Abbey
Charlotte of Savoy	1445–1483	Basilica Notre-Dame in Cléry-Saint-André nearby Orléans
King Charles VIII	1470–1498	Saint Denis Basilica nearby Paris; heart: basilica Notre-Dame-de-Cléry
King Louis XII	1462–1515	Saint Denis Basilica nearby Paris
Joan of France	1464–1505	Annuntiate Convent in Bourges
Anne of Brittany	1477–1514	Saint Denis Basilica nearby Paris
Mary of England	1496–1533	St. Mary's Church in Bury St Edmunds
King Francis I	1494–1547	Saint Denis Basilica nearby Paris
Claude of France	1499–1524	Saint Denis Basilica nearby Paris
Eleanor of Austria	1498–1558	9th Chapel of the infantes in the Monastery of San Lorenzo El Real in El Escorial
King Henry II	1519–1559	Saint Denis Basilica nearby Paris
Catherine de' Medici	1519–1589	Saint Denis Basilica nearby Paris
King Francis II	1544–1560	Saint Denis Basilica nearby Paris
Mary, Queen of Scots	1542–1587	Henry VII's Chapel at Westminster Abbey in London
King Charles IX	1550–1574	Saint Denis Basilica nearby Paris
Elisabeth of Austria	1554–1592	first in the Clarissine convent, since 1782 in the Ducal Crypt at St Stephen's Cathedral in Vienna
King Henry III	1551–1589	first in St-Corneille, since 1610 in Saint Denis Basilica nearby Paris
Louise of Lorraine	1553–1601	first in the Convent des Capucines, St. Honoré in Paris; since 1817 in Saint Denis Basilica nearby Paris
King Henry IV	1553–1610	Saint Denis Basilica nearby Paris
Margaret of Valois	1553–1615	Saint Denis Basilica nearby Paris
Marie de' Medici	1573–1642	first buried at Cologne Cathedral later brought to Saint Denis Basilica; heart Cologne Cathedral (lost)
King Louis XIII	1601–1643	Saint Denis Basilica nearby Paris
Anne of Austria	1601–1666	Saint Denis Basilica nearby Paris
King Louis XIV	1638–1715	Saint Denis Basilica nearby Paris
Maria Theresa of Spain	1638–1683	Saint Denis Basilica nearby Paris
Françoise d'Aubigné, Marquise de Maintenon	1635–1719	Parish Church of Saint-Cyr-l'École
King Louis XV	1710–1774	Saint Denis Basilica nearby Paris
Marie Leszczyńska	1703–1768	Saint Denis Basilica nearby Paris; heart in Notre-Dame de Bon-Secours in Nancy
King Louis XVI	1754–1793	first in the cemetery de la Madeleine, since 1815 in Saint Denis Basilica nearby Paris
Marie Antoinette of Austria	1755–1793	first in the cemetery de la Madeleine, since 1815 in Saint Denis Basilica nearby Paris
King Louis XVII	1785–1795	first in the cemetery Ste-Marguérite, then in Saint Denis Basilica nearby Paris
Emperor Napoleon I	1769–1821	first in St Helena, since 1840 in The Church of the Invalides in Paris
Joséphine de Beauharnais	1763–1814	St Peter and St Paul Church in Rueil-Malmaison
Marie Louise of Austria	1791–1847	New Vault in the Imperial Crypt in the Kapuzinerkirche in Vienna
Emperor Napoleon II	1811–1832	first in the Imperial Crypt in Vienna, since 1940 in The Church of the Invalides in Paris
King Louis XVIII	1755–1824	Saint Denis Basilica nearby Paris
Marie Joséphine of Savoy	1753–1810	first at Westminster Abbey, since 1811 in S. Luzifero Church in Cagliari
King Charles X	1757–1836	Kostanjevica Abbey in Nova Gorica, Slovenia
Maria Theresa of Savoy	1756–1805	Imperial Mausoleum besides Graz Cathedral, Austria; the heart: in Santa Chiara in Naples
King Louis XIX	1775–1844	Kostanjevica Abbey in Nova Gorica, Slovenia
Marie-Thérèse of France	1778–1851	Kostanjevica Abbey in Nova Gorica, Slovenia
King Henry V	1820–1883	Kostanjevica Abbey in Nova Gorica, Slovenia
Maria Theresa of Austria-Este	1817–1886	Kostanjevica Abbey in Nova Gorica, Slovenia
King Louis Philippe I	1773–1850	first at Weybridge, since 1876 in the Orléans Mausoleum in the Royal Chapel at Dreux
Maria Amalia of Naples and Sicily	1782–1866	first at Weybridge, since 1876 in the Orléans Mausoleum in the Royal Chapel at Dreux
Emperor Napoleon III	1808–1873	first in St. Mary's Church at Chislehurst, since 1888 in the St Michael's Abbey in Farnborough
Eugénie de Montijo	1826–1920	St Michael's Abbey in Farnborough

== Georgia ==
Name	Born-died	Burial site
King Bagrat III	c. 960–May	Bedia Cathedral at Agubedia
Martha	–	–
King George I	998 or 1002–1027	Bagrati Cathedral at Kutaisi
Mariam of Vaspurakan	died between 1072 and 1103	–
Alda of Alania	–	–

== Great Britain ==
The kingdoms of England and Scotland were unified with the accession of James I of England and VI of Scotland in 1603. The Act of Union uniting the parliaments took place in 1707, with the United Kingdom formally coming into existence in 1801. Since the 18th century, sovereigns and their spouses have been buried at St George's Chapel, Windsor Castle, with the exception of Queen Victoria and Edward VIII, who are interred with other members of the royal family at Frogmore. Victoria and Albert are interred in the Royal Mausoleum there.

Name	Born-died	Burial site
King James VI and I	1566–1625	Henry VII's Chapel at Westminster Abbey in London
Anne of Denmark	1574–1619	Henry VII's Chapel at Westminster Abbey in London
King Charles I	1600–1649	St George's Chapel, Windsor Castle
Henrietta Maria of France	1609–1669	Saint Denis Basilica nearby Paris
King Charles II	1630–1685	Henry VII's Chapel at Westminster Abbey in London
Catherine of Portugal	1638–1705	first in the Jerónimos Monastery, then in the Royal Pantheon of the House of Braganza at the Monastery of São Vicente de Fora in Lisbon
King James II and VII	1633–1701	Church of Saint-Germain-en-Laye
Anne Hyde	1637–1671	Henry VII's Chapel at Westminster Abbey in London
Mary of Modena	1658–1718	Ste-Marie Abbey in Chaillot
Queen Mary II	1662–1694	Henry VII's Chapel at Westminster Abbey in London
King William III and II	1650–1702	Henry VII's Chapel at Westminster Abbey in London
Queen Anne	1665–1714	Henry VII's Chapel at Westminster Abbey in London
Prince George of Denmark	1653–1708	Henry VII's Chapel at Westminster Abbey in London
King George I	1660–1727	Mausoleum in the garden of Herrenhausen Palace in Hanover
Sophia Dorothea of Celle	1666–1726	St Mary Church in Celle
King George II	1683–1760	Henry VII's Chapel at Westminster Abbey in London
Caroline of Ansbach	1683–1737	Henry VII's Chapel at Westminster Abbey in London
King George III	1738–1820	St George's Chapel, Windsor Castle
Charlotte of Mecklenburg-Strelitz	1744–1818	St George's Chapel, Windsor Castle
King George IV	1762–1830	St George's Chapel, Windsor Castle
Maria Anne Smythe	1756–1837	St John the Baptist Church in Brighton
Caroline of Brunswick	1768–1821	Brunswick Cathedral in Brunswick
King William IV	1765–1837	St George's Chapel, Windsor Castle
Adelaide of Saxe-Meiningen	1792–1849	St George's Chapel, Windsor Castle
Queen Victoria	1819–1901	Royal Mausoleum at Frogmore
Prince Albert of Saxe-Coburg and Gotha	1819–1861	Royal Mausoleum at Frogmore
King Edward VII	1841–1910	St George's Chapel, Windsor Castle
Alexandra of Denmark	1844–1925	St George's Chapel, Windsor Castle
King George V	1865–1936	St George's Chapel, Windsor Castle
Mary of Teck	1867–1953	St George's Chapel, Windsor Castle
King Edward VIII	1894–1972	Royal Burial Ground at Frogmore
Wallis Warfield	1896–1986	Royal Burial Ground at Frogmore
King George VI	1895–1952	St George's Chapel, Windsor Castle
Elizabeth Bowes-Lyon	1900–2002	St George's Chapel, Windsor Castle
Queen Elizabeth II	1926–2022	St George's Chapel, Windsor Castle
Prince Philip, Duke of Edinburgh	1921–2021	St George's Chapel, Windsor Castle
Diana Spencer	1961–1997	Althorp in West Northamptonshire

== Greece ==
Kingdom from 1832 until 1973. The kings from the house of Glücksburg are all buried at Tatoi nearby Athens, the first king from the house of Wittelsbach is interred in Munich, Bavaria.

Name	Born-died	Burial site
King Otto I	1815–1867	Crypt in the Theatinerkirche in Munich
Amalia of Oldenburg	1818–1875	Crypt in the Theatinerkirche in Munich
King George I	1845–1913	Royal Cemetery in the park of Tatoi Palace
Olga Constantinovna of Russia	1851–1926	Royal Cemetery in the park of Tatoi Palace
King Constantine I	1868–1923	Royal Cemetery in the park of Tatoi Palace
Sophia of Prussia	1870–1932	Royal Cemetery in the park of Tatoi Palace
King Alexander	1893–1920	Royal Cemetery in the park of Tatoi Palace
Aspasia Manos	1896–1972	first in the cemetery S. Michele in Venice, then in the Royal Cemetery in the park of Tatoi Palace
King George II	1890–1947	Royal Cemetery in the park of Tatoi Palace
Elisabeth of Romania	1894–1956	Hedinger Church in Sigmaringen
King Paul	1901–1964	Royal Cemetery in the park of Tatoi Palace
Frederica of Hanover	1917–1981	Royal Cemetery in the park of Tatoi Palace
King Constantine II	1940–2023	Royal Cemetery in the park of Tatoi Palace

== Hanover ==
Kingdom from 1814 until 1866 (from 1814 until 1837 in personal union with Great Britain).

Name	Born-died	Burial site
King George III	1738–1820	St George's Chapel, Windsor Castle
Charlotte of Mecklenburg-Strelitz	1744–1818	St George's Chapel, Windsor Castle
King George IV	1762–1830	St George's Chapel, Windsor Castle
Maria Anne Smythe	1756–1837	St John the Baptist Church in Brighton
Caroline of Brunswick	1768–1821	Brunswick Cathedral
King William IV	1765–1837	St George's Chapel, Windsor Castle
Adelaide of Saxe-Meiningen	1792–1849	St George's Chapel, Windsor Castle
King Ernest Augustus	1771–1851	Mausoleum in the garden of Herrenhausen Palace in Hanover
Frederica of Mecklenburg-Strelitz	1778–1841	Mausoleum in the garden of Herrenhausen Palace in Hanover
King George V	1819–1878	St George's Chapel, Windsor Castle
Marie of Saxe-Altenburg	1818–1907	Crypt at Cumberland palace in Gmunden, Upper Austria

== Holy Roman Empire ==
Federation under the Roman-German emperor resp. the German king from 800 until 1806. Under the Habsburg reign, the Kapuzinergruft in Vienna ("Imperial Crypt") became the family burial site of the Roman-German emperors; in earlier times the emperors used to be buried in different cities of the Empire (Aix-la-Chapelle, Speyer, Prague, Graz etc.).

Name	Born-died	Burial site
Charlemagne (Emperor Charles I)	747–814	Aachen Cathedral
Desiderata of the Lombards	?-?	?
Hildegard of the Vinzgau	758–783	St. Arnulf Church in Metz
Fastrada	?–794	St. Alban Abbey nearby Mainz
Luitgard	?–800	St. Martin in Tours
Emperor Louis I	778–840	St. Arnulf Church in Metz
Ermengarde of Hesbaye	780–818	?, Angers
Judith of Bavaria	795–843	St. Martin in Tours
Emperor Lothair I	795–855	Prüm Abbey
Ermengarde of Tours	?-851	Erstein convent in Alsace
Emperor Louis II	806–876	Basilica Sant'Ambrogio in Milan
Engelberga	?-876	St. Emmeram's Abbey in Regensburg
King Louis II the German	806–876	Lorsch Abbey
Hemma	?–876	Sankt Emmeram Abbey in Regensburg
Emperor Charles II	823–877	Saint Denis Basilica nearby Paris
Ermentrude of Orléans	830–869	Saint Denis Basilica nearby Paris
Richilde of Provence	845–910	?
King Carloman	830–880	Altötting
King Louis III	835–882	Lorsch Abbey
Liutgard	?-885	Aschaffenburg
Emperor Charles III	839–888	Reichenau Abbey in Mittelzell on the island of Reichenau
Emperor Arnulf of Carinthia	850–899	St. Emmeram's Abbey, Regensburg
Oda	?-903	Monastery of St. Emmeram in Regensburg
King Louis IV the Child	893–911	Monastery Saint Emmeram in Regensburg
King Conrad I	880–918	Fulda Cathedral
Kunigunde		Lorsch Abbey
King Henry I	876–936	Collegiate Church St Salvatius in Quedlinburg
Mathilde		Collegiate Church St Salvatius in Quedlinburg
Emperor Otto I	912–973	Cathedral of Magdeburg
Eadgyth	910–946	Cathedral of Magdeburg
Adelaide of Italy	931–999	Selz Abbey in Alsace
Emperor Otto II	955–983	St. Peter's Basilica in Rome
Theophanu	950–991	Saint Pantaleon's Church, Cologne
Emperor Otto III	980–1002	Aachen Cathedral
Emperor Henry II	973–1024	Bamberg Cathedral
Cunigunde of Luxembourg	975–1033	Bamberg Cathedral
Emperor Conrad II	990–1039	Speyer Cathedral
Gisela of Swabia	989–1043	Speyer Cathedral
Emperor Henry III	1017–1056	Speyer Cathedral; the heart in St. Ulrich Chapel Goslar
Gunhilda of Denmark	1018–1038	Limburg Abbey
Agnes of Poitou	1025–1077	St Petronella Chapel in St. Peter's Basilica in Rome
Emperor Henry IV	1050–1106	Speyer Cathedral
Bertha of Savoy	1051–1087	Speyer Cathedral
Eupraxia of Kiev	?-1109	Kyiv
King Conrad	1074–1101	Santa Reparata Cathedral, later replaced by the Cathedral of Santa Maria del Fiore in Florence
King Rudolf of Rheinfeld (anti-king)	1025–1080	Merseburg Cathedral
King Hermann of Luxembourg (anti-king)	c. 1035 – 1088	?
Sophia of Formbach	?-?	?
Emperor Henry V	1086–1125	Speyer Cathedral
Queen Matilda	1102–1167	first in the Collegiate Church of Bec, then in Rouen Cathedral
Emperor Lothair III	1075–1137	Königslutter Cathedral
Richenza of Northeim	1095–1141	Königslutter Cathedral
King Conrad III	1093–1152	Bamberg Cathedral
Gertrude of Comburg	1095–1130	Lorch Abbey
Gertrude of Sulzbach	1113–1146	Ebrach Abbey
King Henry Berengar	1137–1150	Lorch Abbey
Emperor Frederick I	1122–1190	his flesh is buried at St Peter's in Antiochia, the heart in Tarsus, the bones in Tyrus Cathedral
Adela von Vohburg	1128–1187	Weißenau convent nearby Ravensburg
Beatrice of Burgundy	1144–1184	Speyer Cathedral
Emperor Henry VI	1165–1197	Palermo Cathedral
Constance, Queen of Sicily	1154–1198	Palermo Cathedral
King Philip of Swabia	1176–1208	Speyer Cathedral
Irene Angelina	1181–1208	Lorch Abbey
Emperor Otto IV	1175–1218	Brunswick Cathedral
Beatrice of Swabia	1198–1212	?
Marie of Brabant	1191–1260	St Peter in Leuven
Emperor Frederick II	1194–1250	Palermo Cathedral
Constance of Aragon	1179–1222	Palermo Cathedral
Isabella II of Jerusalem	1211–1228	Andria Cathedral
Bianca Lancia	1210–1233	Gioia del Colle
Isabella of England	1217–1241	Andria Cathedral
King Henry VII	1211–1241	Cosenza Cathedral
Margarete of Babenberg	1204–1266	Lilienfeld Abbey, Lower Austria
King Henry Raspe (anti-king)	1204–1247	St Catherine Convent in Eisenach; heart: Dominican Church
Elisabeth of Brandenburg, Landgravine of Thuringia	1206–1231	?
King Conrad IV	1228–1254	Heart and entrails in Melfi; the body was burnt in Messina
Elisabeth of Bavaria	1230–1273	Collegiate Church in Stams in Tirol
King William of Holland	1227–1256	Middelburg
Elisabeth of Brunswick-Lüneburg	1236–1266	?
King Richard of Cornwall	1209–1272	Hayles Abbey
Isabel Marshal	1200–1240	Beaulieu Abbey, Hampshire; heart: Tewkesbury Abbey
Sanchia of Provence	1225–1261	Hayles Abbey, Gloucester
Beatrice of Falkenburg	?–1277	Friars Minor in Oxford
King Alfons of Castile (anti-king)	1221–1284	Murcia Cathedral
Violant of Aragon	1236–1301	?
King Rudolph I	1218–1291	Speyer Cathedral
Gertrude of Hohenberg	1225–1281	first in the Basel minster, in 1770 in St. Blasien in the Black Forest, since 1809 in the Collegiate Church of the St. Paul's Abbey in the Lavanttal
Agnes of Burgundy	1270–1323	Dome de Vieux Château et d'Aigne le Duc in Paris
King Adolf of Nassau	1250–1298	Speyer Cathedral
King Albrecht I	1255–1308	Speyer Cathedral
Elisabeth of Tirol	1262–1313	Collegiate Church of the St. Paul's Abbey in the Lavanttal
Emperor Henry VII	1274–1313	Pisa Cathedral
Margaret of Brabant	1276–1311	Minorite Church in Genoa
King Frederick III	1289–1330	Ducal Crypt at St Stephen's Cathedrale in Vienna
Elisabeth of Aragon	1296–1330	Minoritenkirche in Vienna
Emperor Louis IV	1281–1347	Crypt in the Frauenkirche in Munich
Beatrice of Silesia	1290–1322	Crypt in the Frauenkirche in Munich
Margaret II, Countess of Hainaut	1293–1356	Minorite Church in Valenciennes
Emperor Charles IV	1316–1378	Royal Crypt in St. Vitus Cathedral in Prague
Blanche of Valois	1317–1348	Royal Crypt in St. Vitus Cathedral in Prague
Anne of Bavaria	1329–1353	?
Anna von Schweidnitz	1339–1362	St. Vitus Cathedral, Prague
Elizabeth of Pomerania	1347–1393	St. Vitus Cathedral, Prague
King Günther von Schwarzburg (anti-king)	1304–1349	Frankfurt Cathedral
King Wenceslaus	1361–1419	Royal Crypt in St. Vitus Cathedral in Prague
Joanna of Bavaria	1356–1386	Cistercian convent in Zbraslav
Sophia of Bavaria	1376–1425	St Martins' Cathedral in Bratislava
King Frederick of Brunswick (anti-king)	1357–1400	Brunswick Cathedral
Anna of Saxe-Wittenberg	?-?	?
King Rupert of Palatinate	1352–1410	Heiliggeistkirche in Heidelberg
Elisabeth of Nuremberg	1358–1411	Heiliggeistkirche in Heidelberg
King Jobst of Moravia	1351–1411	Church of St. Thomas (Brno) in Brno
Elizabeth of Opole	1360–1411	?
Emperor Sigismund	1368–1437	Oradea Cathedral
Mary, Queen of Hungary	1370–1395	Cathedral in Oradea
Barbara of Cilli	1391–1451	Royal Crypt in St. Vitus Cathedral in Prague
King Albert II	1307–1439	Székesfehérvár Basilica
Elizabeth of Luxembourg	1409–1442	Székesfehérvár Basilica
Emperor Frederick III	1415–1493	High grave at St Stephen's Cathedrale in Vienna; heart: Stadtpfarrkirche in Linz
Eleanor of Portugal	1436–1467	Stadtpfarrkirche in Wiener Neustadt
Emperor Maximilian I	1459–1519	St George's Chapel in Wiener Neustadt castle; the heart in the Church of Our Lady in Bruges
Mary of Burgundy	1457–1482	Church of Our Lady in Bruges
Bianca Maria Sforza	1472–1510	Collegiate Church in Stams in Tirol
Emperor Charles V	1500–1558	first in San Jerónimo de Yuste, since 1574 in the Pantheon of the Kings in the Monastery of San Lorenzo El Real in El Escorial
Isabella of Portugal	1503–1539	Pantheon of the Kings in the Monastery of San Lorenzo El Real in El Escorial
Emperor Ferdinand I	1503–1564	High grave in St. Vitus Cathedral in Prague
Anne of Bohemia and Hungary	1503–1547	High grave in St. Vitus Cathedral in Prague
Emperor Maximilian II	1527–1576	High grave in St. Vitus Cathedral in Prague
Maria of Spain	1528–1603	in the choir of the S. Clara convent de las Descalzas Reales in Madrid
Emperor Rudolf II	1552–1612	Royal Crypt in St. Vitus Cathedral in Prague
Emperor Matthias	1557–1619	Founder's Vault in the Imperial Crypt in the Kapuzinerkirche in Vienna; heart: Augustinerkirche
Anna of Tyrol	1585–1618	Founder's Vault in the Imperial Crypt in the Kapuzinerkirche in Vienna; heart: Augustinerkirche
Emperor Ferdinand II	1578–1637	Imperial Mausoleum besides Graz Cathedral; the heart: Augustinerkirche
Maria Anna of Bavaria	1574–1616	Imperial Mausoleum besides Graz Cathedral; the heart: Augustinerkirche
Eleonore Gonzaga	1598–1655	first in the Carmelite Convent, since 1782 in the Ducal Crypt at St Stephen's Cathedrale in Vienna
Emperor Ferdinand III	1608–1657	first in Graz cathedral, then in Leopold's Vault in the Imperial Crypt in the Kapuzinerkirche in Vienna; the heart: Augustinerkirche
Maria Anna of Spain	1608–1646	Leopold's Vault in the Imperial Crypt in the Kapuzinerkirche in Vienna
Maria Leopoldine of Austria	1632–1649	first in Graz cathedral, then in the Leopold's Vault in the Imperial Crypt in the Kapuzinerkirche in Vienna; the heart: Augustinerkirche
Eleanor of Mantua	1630–1686	Leopold's Vault in the Imperial Crypt in the Kapuzinerkirche in Vienna; the heart: Augustinerkirche
Emperor Leopold I	1640–1705	Charles’ Vault in the Imperial Crypt in the Kapuzinerkirche in Vienna; the heart: Augustinerkirche
Margaret Theresa of Spain	1651–1673	Leopold's Vault in the Imperial Crypt in the Kapuzinerkirche in Vienna; the heart: Augustinerkirche
Claudia Felicitas of Austria	1653–1676	Dominican Church in Vienna; the heart: Imperial Crypt in the Kapuzinerkirche
Eleonore Magdalene of Neuburg	1655–1720	Leopold's Vault in the Imperial Crypt in the Kapuzinerkirche in Vienna
Emperor Joseph I	1678–1711	Charles’ Vault in the Imperial Crypt in the Kapuzinerkirche in Vienna; the heart: Augustinerkirche
Wilhelmine Amalie of Brunswick	1673–1742	Salesianerinnenkloster in Vienna; the heart: Charles’ Vault in the Imperial Crypt
Emperor Charles VI	1685–1740	Charles’ Vault in the Imperial Crypt in the Kapuzinerkirche in Vienna; the heart: Augustinerkirche
Elisabeth Christine of Brunswick-Wolfenbüttel	1691–1750	Charles’ Vault in the Imperial Crypt in the Kapuzinerkirche in Vienna; the heart: Augustinerkirche
Emperor Charles VII	1697–1745	Crypt in the Theatinerkirche in Munich; heart in the Chapel of the Miraculous Image (Gnadenkapelle) in Altötting
Maria Amalia of Austria	1701–1756	Crypt in the Theatinerkirche in Munich; heart in the Chapel of the Miraculous Image (Gnadenkapelle) in Altötting
Emperor Francis I Stephen	1708–1765	Maria Theresia's Vault in the Imperial Crypt in the Kapuzinerkirche in Vienna; the heart: Augustinerkirche
Maria Theresa of Austria	1717–1780	Maria Theresia's Vault in the Imperial Crypt in the Kapuzinerkirche in Vienna; the heart: Augustinerkirche
Emperor Joseph II	1741–1790	Maria Theresia's Vault in the Imperial Crypt in the Kapuzinerkirche in Vienna
Isabella Maria of Parma	1741–1763	Maria Theresia's Vault in the Imperial Crypt in the Kapuzinerkirche in Vienna
Maria Josepha of Bavaria	1739–1767	Maria Theresia's Vault in the Imperial Crypt in the Kapuzinerkirche in Vienna
Emperor Leopold II	1747–1792	Tuscany Vault in the Imperial Crypt in the Kapuzinerkirche in Vienna; the heart: Augustinerkirche
Maria Luisa of Spain	1745–1792	Tuscany Vault in the Imperial Crypt in the Kapuzinerkirche in Vienna; the heart: Augustinerkirche
Emperor Francis II	1768–1835	Francis’ Vault in the Imperial Crypt in the Kapuzinerkirche in Vienna; the heart: Augustinerkirche
Elisabeth of Württemberg	1767–1790	Francis’ Vault in the Imperial Crypt in the Kapuzinerkirche in Vienna; the heart: Augustinerkirche
Maria Theresa of Naples and Sicily	1772–1807	Francis’ Vault in the Imperial Crypt in the Kapuzinerkirche in Vienna
Maria Ludovika of Austria-Este	1787–1816	Francis’ Vault in the Imperial Crypt in the Kapuzinerkirche in Vienna; the heart: Augustinerkirche
Caroline Augusta of Bavaria	1792–1873	Francis’ Vault in the Imperial Crypt in the Kapuzinerkirche in Vienna

== Hungary ==
Kingdom from 1000 until 1540, afterwards in personal union with Austria. Most of the kings were buried in Székesfehérvár basilica or in Oradea Cathedral (Hungarian: Nagyvárad) in today's Romania. Both burial sites were destroyed by the Turks.

Name	Born-died	Burial site
King Andrew I	1015–1060	Benedictine Abbey of Tihany
King Béla I	1015–1063	Szekszárd Abbey
King Géza I	1048–1077	Vác Cathedral
King Ladislaus I	1048–1095	Oradea Cathedral, Romania
King Coloman I	1070–1116	Székesfehérvár Basilica
King Stephen II	1101–1131	Oradea Cathedral, Romania
King Béla II	1110–1141	Székesfehérvár Basilica
King Géza II	1130–1162	Székesfehérvár Basilica
King Béla III	1148–1196	Székesfehérvár Basilica
Margaret of France	1158–1197	Crusader Cathedral of Tyre
King Emeric	1174–1204	Eger Cathedral
King Ladislaus III	1199–1205	Székesfehérvár Basilica
King Andrew II	1177–1235	Cistercian Monastery in Igris
Gertrude of Merania	1185–1213	Pilis Abbey
Yolanda of Courtenay	1200–1233	Cistercian Monastery in Igris
King Béla IV	1206–1270	Minorite Church in Esztergom
King Stephen V	1240–1272	Dominican Monastery at Csepel
King Ladislaus IV	1262–1290	Csanad Cathedral
Elizabeth of Sicily	1261–1303	Monastery of St Peter's, Naples
King Andrew III	1265–1301	Székesfehérvár Basilica
Agnes of Austria	1281–1364	first in Königsfelden, then in St. Blasien, then in the Collegiate Church of the St. Paul's Abbey in the Lavanttal, Austria
Otto III of Bavaria	1261–1312	Cistercian Monastery at Seligenthal, Bavaria
Catherine of Austria	1256–1282	Cistercian Monastery at Seligenthal, Bavaria
King Charles I Robert	1288–1342	Székesfehérvár Basilica
King Louis I	1326–1382	Székesfehérvár Basilica
Queen Mary	1370–1395	Oradea Cathedral, Romania
King Charles II	1345–1386	St Andrew in Visegrad
Emperor Sigismund	1368–1437	Oradea Cathedral, Romania
King Albert II	1307–1439	Székesfehérvár Basilica
Elizabeth of Luxembourg	1409–1442	Székesfehérvár Basilica
King Ladislas the Posthumous	1440–1457	Ducal Crypt in St. Vitus Cathedral in Prague
King Matthias Corvinus	1443–1490	Székesfehérvár Basilica
Beatrice of Naples	1457–1508	S. Pietro Abbey in Naples
King Vladislaus II	1456–1516	Székesfehérvár Basilica
King Louis II	1506–1526	Székesfehérvár Basilica
Mary of Austria	1505–1558	9th chapel of the infants in the Monastery of San Lorenzo El Real in El Escorial
King John I Szapolyai	1526–1540	Székesfehérvár Basilica

== Italy ==
Kingdom from 1713 until 1946 (until 1720 Kingdom of Sicily and until 1861 Kingdom of Sardinia). Family burial sites are the Basilica di Superga in Turin and since the unification of Italy the Pantheon in Rome.

Name	Born-died	Burial site
King Victor Amadeus II	1666–1732	Basilica of Superga in Turin
Anne Marie d'Orléans	1669–1728	Basilica of Superga in Turin
Anna Canalis di Cumiana	1680–1769
King Charles Emmanuel III	1701–1773	Basilica of Superga in Turin
Anne Christine of Sulzbach	1704–1723	first in the Cathedral S. Giovanni Battista, since 1786 in the Basilica of Superga in Turin
Polyxena of Hesse-Rotenburg	1706–1735	first in the Cathedral S. Giovanni Battista, since 1786 in the Basilica of Superga in Turin
Elisabeth Therese of Lorraine	1711–1741	first in the Cathedral S. Giovanni Battista, since 1786 in the Basilica of Superga in Turin
King Victor Amadeus III	1726–1796	Basilica of Superga in Turin
Maria Antonia Ferdinanda of Spain	1729–1785	Basilica of Superga in Turin
King Charles Emmanuel IV	1751–1819	Jesuite Church Il Gesù in Rome
Clotilde of France	1759–1802	Sta. Catarina e Chiaia in Naples
King Victor Emmanuel I	1751–1819	Basilica of Superga in Turin
Maria Teresa of Austria-Este	1773–1832	Basilica of Superga in Turin
King Charles Felix	1765–1831	Cistercian Abbey of Hautecombe, Savoy, France
Maria Cristina of Naples and Sicily	1779–1849	Cistercian Abbey of Hautecombe, Savoy, France
King Charles Albert	1798–1849	Basilica of Superga in Turin
Maria Theresa of Austria-Tuscany	1801–1855	Basilica of Superga in Turin
King Victor Emmanuel II	1820–1878	Pantheon in Rome
Adelaide of Austria	1822–1855	Basilica of Superga in Turin
Rosa Vercellana	1833–1885	first in S. Matteo in Pisa, since 1885 in the Mausoelum of "Bela Rosin" nearby Mirafiori castle in Turin
King Umberto I	1844–1900	Pantheon in Rome
Margherita of Savoy	1851–1926	Pantheon in Rome
King Victor Emmanuel III	1869–1947	first in the church St. Catherine in Alexandria, since 2017 in the Sanctuary of Vicoforte
Elena of Montenegro	1873–1952	first in Saint-Lazare cemetery in Montpellier, since 2017 in the Sanctuary of Vicoforte
King Umberto II	1904–1983	Cistercian Abbey of Hautecombe, Savoy, France
Marie-José of Belgium	1906–2001	Cistercian Abbey of Hautecombe, Savoy, France

== Liechtenstein ==
Principality since 1608. Until the dissolution of the Austrian-Hungarian monarchy, the princes were buried in Vranov nearby Brno close to their residences in Lednice and Valtice. Afterwards, a new burial site was erected in the territory of the principality.

Name	Born-died	Burial site
Prince Charles I	1569–1627	Liechtenstein Crypt in Vranov nearby Brno, Czech Republic
Anna Maria Šemberová of Boskovice and Černá Hora	1577–1625	Liechtenstein Crypt in Vranov nearby Brno, Czech Republic
Prince Charles Eusebius	1611–1684	Liechtenstein Crypt in Vranov nearby Brno, Czech Republic
Johanna Beatrix of Dietrichstein	?-1676	Liechtenstein Crypt in Vranov nearby Brno, Czech Republic
Prince John Adam I	1657–1712	Liechtenstein Crypt in Vranov nearby Brno, Czech Republic
Erdmuthe Maria Theresia of Dietrichstein	1652–1735	Liechtenstein Crypt in Vranov nearby Brno, Czech Republic
Prince Joseph Wencelas I	1696–1772	Liechtenstein Crypt in Vranov nearby Brno, Czech Republic
Anna Maria of Liechtenstein	1699–1753	crypt under the Pauline Church in Vienna (the crypt does no longer exist)
Prince Anton Florian	1656–1721	Liechtenstein Crypt in Vranov nearby Brno, Czech Republic
Eleonore Barbara von Thun und Hohenstein	1661–1723	crypt under the Pauline Church in Vienna (the crypt does no longer exist)
Prince Joseph John Adam	1690–1732	Liechtenstein Crypt in Vranov nearby Brno, Czech Republic
Gabriele von Liechtenstein	1692–1713	Liechtenstein Crypt in Vranov nearby Brno, Czech Republic
Maria Anna von Thun-Hohenstein	1698–1716	Liechtenstein Crypt in Vranov nearby Brno, Czech Republic
Maria Anna von Oettingen-Spielberg	1693–1729	Parish Church at Glogów in Silesia
Maria Anna Kottulinsky	1707–1788	Mariabrunn parish church in Vienna-Hütteldorf
Prince John Nepomuk Charles	1724–1748	Liechtenstein Crypt in Vranov nearby Brno, Czech Republic
Maria Josefa von Harrach	1727–1788	Capuchin Church at Roudnice nad Labem
Prince Francis Joseph I	1726–1781	Liechtenstein Crypt in Vranov nearby Brno, Czech Republic
Leopoldine von Sternberg	1733–1809	St Andrew Church in Vienna-Hütteldorf
Prince Aloys I	1759–1805	Liechtenstein Crypt in Vranov nearby Brno, Czech Republic
Karoline von Manderscheid-Blankenheim	1768–1831	Hietzing cemetery in Vienna, group 2, no 15
Prince John I Joseph	1760–1836	Liechtenstein Crypt in Vranov nearby Brno, Czech Republic
Josefa von Fürstenberg-Weitra	1776–1848	Liechtenstein Crypt in Vranov nearby Brno, Czech Republic
Prince Aloys II	1796–1858	Liechtenstein Crypt in Vranov nearby Brno, Czech Republic
Franziska Kinsky of Wchinitz and Tettau	1813–1881	Liechtenstein Crypt in Vranov nearby Brno, Czech Republic
Prince John II	1840–1929	Liechtenstein Crypt in Vranov nearby Brno, Czech Republic
Prince Francis I	1853–1938	Liechtenstein Crypt in Vranov nearby Brno, Czech Republic
Elisabeth von Gutmann	1875–1947	Princely Crypt beside Vaduz Cathedral
Prince Francis Joseph II	1906–1989	Princely Crypt beside Vaduz Cathedral
Georgina von Wilczek	1921–1989	Princely Crypt beside Vaduz Cathedral
Marie Kinsky of Wchinitz and Tettau	1940–2021	Princely Crypt beside Vaduz Cathedral

== Lithuania ==
Kingdom from 1251, later Grand Princehood. The Lithuanian dynasty from the family of Gediminas (the Gediminid dynasty) ruled the Grand Duchy of Lithuania and later the Kingdom of Poland.

Name	Born-died	Burial site
Grand Duke Vaišvilkas	1223–1267/68	Volodymyr-Volynskyi
Grand Duke Algirdas	1296–1377	Maišiagala, Lithuania
Grand Duke Skirgaila	c. 1353–1397	Kyiv Pechersk Lavra
Grand Duke Vytautas the Great	1350–1430	Vilnius Cathedral, Lithuania
Grand Duke Jogaila	1348–1434	Wawel Cathedral in Kraków
King Casimir IV	1427–1492	Wawel Cathedral in Kraków
Grand Duke Alexander I	1461–1506	Vilnius Cathedral, Lithuania
Helena of Moscow	1476–1513	Cathedral of the Theotokos in Vilnius, Lithuania
Grand Duke Sigismund I	1467–1548	Wawel Cathedral in Kraków
Grand Duke Sigismund II Augustus	1520–1572	Wawel Cathedral in Kraków
Elisabeth of Austria	1526–1545	Vilnius Cathedral, Lithuania
Barbara Radziwiłł	1520–1551	Vilnius Cathedral, Lithuania

== Luxembourg ==
Independent grand-duchy since 1890. All grand-dukes have been interred in Luxembourg Cathedral.

Name	Born-died	Burial site
Grand Duke Adolphe I	1817–1905	Schoss Weilburg
Elisabeth of Russia	1826–1845	Orthodox Church St. Elizabeth in Wiesbaden
Adelheid Marie of Anhalt-Dessau	1833–1916	Schloss Weilburg
Grand Duke William IV	1852–1912	Schloss Weilburg
Marie Anne of Portugal	1861–1942	Cathedral Notre-Dame in Luxembourg
Grand Duchess Marie-Adélaïde	1894–1924	Cathedral Notre-Dame in Luxembourg
Grand Duchess Charlotte	1896–1985	Cathedral Notre-Dame in Luxembourg
Felix of Bourbon-Parma	1893–1970	Cathedral Notre-Dame in Luxembourg
Grand Duke Jean	1921–2019	Cathedral Notre-Dame in Luxembourg
Joséphine-Charlotte of Belgium	1927–2005	Cathedral Notre-Dame in Luxembourg

== Monaco ==
Principality since 1633. All princes were buried in Monaco cathedral. Some graves no longer exist, as the former cathedral had been destroyed.

Name	Born-died	Burial site
Prince Honoré II	1596–1662	Cathedral of Monaco
Ippolita Trivulzio	1600–1638	Cathedral of Monaco
Prince Louis I	1642–1701	Cathedral of Monaco
Catherine Charlotte de Gramont	1639–1678	Capuchin Church in Paris
Prince Antoine I	1661–1731	Cathedral of Monaco
Marie of Lorraine	1674–1724	Cathedral of Monaco
Princess Louise-Hippolyte	1697–1731	Cathedral of Monaco
Prince Jacques I	1689–1751	Church of Torigni-sur-Vire
Prince Honoré III	1720–1795	remains of body are unknown
Maria Caterina Brignole	1737–1813	Chapel of St Louis in Wimbledon
Prince Honoré IV	1758–1819	Cathedral of Monaco
Louise d'Aumont	1759–1864	Cathedral of Monaco
Prince Honoré V	1778–1841	Cathedral of Monaco
Prince Florestan	1785–1865	Cathedral of Monaco
Maria Caroline Gibert de Lametz	1793–1879	Cathedral of Monaco
Prince Charles III	1818–1889	Cathedral of Monaco
Antoinette de Mérode	1828–1864	Cathedral of Monaco
Prince Albert I	1848–1922	Cathedral of Monaco
Mary Victoria Douglas-Hamilton	1850–1922	Budapest
Marie-Alice Heine, duchess of Richelieu	1858–1925	Cimetière du Père-Lachaise in Paris.
Prince Louis II	1870–1949	Cathedral of Monaco
Ghislaine Dommanget	1900–1991	Passy Cemetery in Paris
Prince Rainier III	1923–2005	Cathedral of Monaco
Grace Patricia Kelly	1929–1982	Cathedral of Monaco

== Montenegro ==
Kingdom from 1910 until 1918.

Name	Born-died	Burial site
King Nicholas I	1841–1921	Birth of the Virgin Church in Cetinje
Milena Vukotić	1847–1923	Birth of the Virgin Church in Cetinje

== Naples ==
In the Middle Ages two separate kingdoms, then under foreign rule. From 1735 until 1860 independent kingdom under the Bourbon dynasty. Most of the kings are buried at Santa Chiara in Naples.

Name	Born-died	Burial site
King Charles III	1716–1788	Pantheon of the kings in the Monastery of San Lorenzo El Real in El Escorial
Maria Amalia of Saxony	1724–1760	Pantheon of the kings in the Monastery of San Lorenzo El Real in El Escorial
King Ferdinand I	1751–1825	Burial site of the Bourbon dynasty at Santa Chiara in Naples
Maria Carolina of Austria	1752–1814	Tuscany Vault in the Imperial Crypt in the Kapuzinerkirche in Vienna; the heart: Augustinerkirche
Lucia Migliaccio	1770–1826	S. Ferdinando in Naples
King Francis I	1777–1838	Burial site of the Bourbon dynasty at Santa Chiara in Naples
Maria Clementina of Austria	1777–1801	Burial site of the Bourbon dynasty at Santa Chiara in Naples
María Isabella of Spain	1789–1848	Burial site of the Bourbon dynasty at Santa Chiara in Naples
King Ferdinand II	1810–1859	Burial site of the Bourbon dynasty at Santa Chiara in Naples
Maria Cristina of Savoy	1812–1836	Burial site of the Bourbon dynasty at Santa Chiara in Naples
Maria Theresa of Austria	1816–1867	first at Santa Maria della Stella, Albano Laziale nearby Rom, since 1962 in the burial site of the Bourbon dynasty at Santa Chiara in Naples
King Francis II	1836–1894	first in Arco, then in Trento, then at St. Spirito dei Napoletani in Rome and since 1984 in the burial site of the Bourbon dynasty at Santa Chiara in Naples
Maria Sophie of Bavaria	1841–1925	first in Arco, then in Trento, then at St. Spirito dei Napoletani in Rome and since 1984 in the burial site of the Bourbon dynasty at Santa Chiara in Naples

== Netherlands ==
Kingdom since 1815 (from 1806 until 1810 kingdom under Napoleon's brother). All kings from the Nassau dynasty are buried in the New Church in Delft.

Name	Born-died	Burial site
King Louis I	1778–1846	St-Gilles church in Saint-Leu-la-Forêt
Hortense de Beauharnais	1783–1837	St-Gilles church in Saint-Leu-la-Forêt
King Louis II	1804–1831	St-Gilles church in Saint-Leu-la-Forêt
Charlotte Bonaparte	1802–1839	St-Gilles church in Saint-Leu-la-Forêt
King William I	1772–1843	New Church in Delft
Wilhelmine of Prussia	1774–1837	New Church in Delft
Henrietta d'Oultremont de Wégimont	1792–1864	family tomb in the chapel in the park of Wégimont castle in Soumagne near Liège, Belgium
King William II	1792–1849	New Church in Delft
Anna Pavlovna of Russia	1795–1865	New Church in Delft
King William III	1817–1890	New Church in Delft
Sophie of Württemberg	1818–1877	New Church in Delft
Emma of Waldeck and Pyrmont	1858–1934	New Church in Delft
Queen Wilhelmina	1880–1962	New Church in Delft
Hendrik of Mecklenburg-Schwerin	1876–1934	New Church in Delft
Queen Juliana	1909–2004	New Church in Delft
Bernhard of Lippe-Biesterfeld	1911–2004	New Church in Delft
Claus von Amsberg	1926–2002	New Church in Delft

== Norway ==
Established as a unified kingdom c. 872. In the Middle Ages the king would be buried in the city of his residence which varied between Bergen, Trondheim and Oslo. From 1380 until 1905 the kingdom was in personal union with Denmark or Sweden with the king mostly residing and being buried outside Norway. The Norwegian kings of the modern era and their spouses are as an established custom buried at Akershus Fortress in Oslo.

Name	Born-died	Burial site
King Harald I	c.850–933	Haraldshaugen in Haugesund
King Erik I	c.895–954	Stainmoore in England
King Håkon I	c.920–961	Seim in Hordaland
King Olav II	995–1030	Nidaros Cathedral, Trondheim
King Knut	c 985/995 – 1035	Old Minster, Winchester. Bones now in Winchester Cathedral
King Magnus I	1024–1047	Nidaros Cathedral, Trondheim
King Harald III	1015–1066	Mary Church, Trondheim later reinterred in Elgeseter Priory (now demolished)
King Magnus II	c. 1048–1069	Nidaros Cathedral, Trondheim
King Olav III	1050–1093	Nidaros Cathedral, Trondheim
King Øystein I	c. 1088–1123	Nidaros Cathedral, Trondheim
King Olav Magnusson	1099–1115	Nidaros Cathedral, Trondheim
King Sigurd I	1090–1130	First in St. Hallvard's cathedral, later reinterred in Akershus Fortress, Oslo
King Sigurd II	1133–1155	Christ Church, Bergen
King Øystein II	c. 1125–1157	Church of Foss in Tunge, Båhuslen
King Inge I	1135–1161	St Hallvard's church, Oslo (demolished)
King Sverre	c. 1145/1151–1202	Christ Church, Bergen
King Håkon III	1182–1204	Christ Church, Bergen
King Guttorm	1199–1204	Nidaros Cathedral, Trondheim
King Inge II	1185–1217	Nidaros Cathedral, Trondheim
King Haakon IV	1204–1263	Christ Church, Bergen
King Magnus VI	1238–1280	Christ Church, Bergen
King Erik II	1268–1299	Christ Church, Bergen
King Håkon V	1270–1319	First in St Mary's Church, later reinterred in Akershus Fortress, Oslo
King Håkon VI	1341–1380	St Mary Church, Oslo
King Olav IV	1370–1387	Convent Church at Sorø
Queen Margrete	1353–1412	first in the Convent Church at Sorø, then in the Roskilde Cathedral
King Erik III	1382–1459	Our Lady Church at Darlowo, Poland
King Christian I	1426–1481	Roskilde Cathedral
Dorothea of Brandenburg	1430–1495	Roskilde Cathedral
King Hans	1455–1513	first in Gråbrødre Church, then in Saint Canute's Cathedral
Christina of Saxony	1461–1521	first in Gråbrødre Church, then in Saint Canute's Cathedral in Odense
King Christian II	1481–1552	first in Gråbrødre Church, then in Saint Canute's Cathedral in Odense
Isabella of Austria	1501–1525	first at St Peter Church in Gent, then in Saint Canute's Cathedral in Odense
King Frederik I	1471–1533	St Peter's Cathedral in Schleswig
Anna of Brandenburg	1487–1514	Convent Church in Bornesholm
Sophie of Pomerania	1498–1568	St Peter's Cathedral in Schleswig
King Christian III	1503–1559	Roskilde Cathedral
Dorothea of Saxe-Lauenburg	1511–1571	Roskilde Cathedral
King Frederik II	1534–1588	Roskilde Cathedral
Sophie of Mecklenburg-Güstrow	1557–1631	Roskilde Cathedral
King Christian IV	1577–1648	Roskilde Cathedral
Anne Catherine of Brandenburg	1575–1612	Roskilde Cathedral
Kirsten Munk	1598–1658	Saint Canute's Cathedral in Odense
King Frederik III	1609–1670	Roskilde Cathedral
Sophie Amalie of Brunswick-Calenberg	1628–1658	Roskilde Cathedral
King Christian V	1646–1699	Roskilde Cathedral
Charlotte Amalie of Hesse-Kassel	1650–1714	Roskilde Cathedral
King Frederik IV	1671–1730	Roskilde Cathedral
Louise of Mecklenburg-Güstrow	1667–1721	Roskilde Cathedral
Anne Sophie Reventlow	1693–1743	Roskilde Cathedral
King Christian VI	1699–1746	Roskilde Cathedral
Sophie Magdalene of Brandenburg-Kulmbach	1700–1770	Roskilde Cathedral
King Frederik V	1723–1766	Roskilde Cathedral
Louise of Great Britain	1724–1751	Roskilde Cathedral
Juliana Maria of Brunswick-Wolfenbüttel	1729–1796	Roskilde Cathedral
King Christian VII	1749–1808	Roskilde Cathedral
Caroline Matilda of Great Britain	1751–1775	Stadtkirche St. Marien in Celle
King Frederik VI	1768–1839	Roskilde Cathedral
Marie of Hesse-Kassel	1767–1852	Roskilde Cathedral
King Karl II	1748–1818	Riddarholm Church in Stockholm
Hedvig Elisabeth Charlotte of Holstein-Gottorp	1759–1818	Riddarholm Church in Stockholm
King Karl III Johan	1764–1844	Riddarholm Church in Stockholm
Désirée Clary	1777–1860	Riddarholm Church in Stockholm
King Oscar I	1799–1859	Riddarholm Church in Stockholm
Josephine of Leuchtenberg	1807–1876	Riddarholm Church in Stockholm
King Karl IV	1826–1872	Riddarholm Church in Stockholm
Louise of the Netherlands	1828–1871	Riddarholm Church in Stockholm
King Oscar II	1829–1907	Riddarholm Church in Stockholm
Sophia of Nassau	1836–1913	Riddarholm Church in Stockholm
King Haakon VII	1872–1957	Akershus Fortress, Oslo
Maud of Wales	1869–1938	Akershus Fortress, Oslo
King Olav V	1903–1991	Akershus Fortress, Oslo
Märtha of Sweden	1901–1954	Akershus Fortress, Oslo
King Harald V	1937–2026	Akershus Fortress, Oslo

== Ottoman Empire ==
Established in 1299 as a beylik (principality) and gradually became an empire as its territory expanded, lasting until 1922. Most of the sultans and consorts were buried in Bursa and Istanbul, both of which were once the imperial capital.

Name	Born-died	Burial site
Sultan Osman I	?-1323/1324	Tomb of Osman Gazi in Bursa
Rabia Bala Hatun	1250/1260-1324	Tomb of Sheikh Edebali in Bilecik
Sultan Orhan	1281–1362	Tomb of Orhan Gazi in Bursa
Nilüfer Hatun	c. 1283-c. 1383	Tomb of Orhan Gazi in Bursa
Asporça Hatun	c. 1300–1362	Tomb of Orhan Gazi in Bursa
Eftandise Hatun	Unknown	Bursa
Sultan Murad I	1326–1389	Organs buried at the Tomb of Sultan Murad in Kosovo Field, other remains buried at the Tomb of Sultan Murad in Bursa
Gülçiçek Hatun	c. 1335-?	Bursa
Kera Tamara	c. 1340-c. 1389	Bursa
Sultan Bayezid I	c. 1360–1403	Bursa
Devlet Hatun	c. 1361–1414	Tomb of Devlet Hatun in Bursa
Sultan Mehmed I	1389–1421	Green Tomb in Bursa
Sultan Murad II	1404–1451	Muradiye Complex in Bursa
Sultan Hatun	Unknown	Ishak Pasha Mausoleum in İnegöl
Hüma Hatun	c. 1410–1449	Muradiye Complex in Bursa
Sultan Mehmed II	1432–1481	Fatih Mosque in Istanbul
Gülbahar Hatun	?-c. 1492	Fatih Mosque in Istanbul
Gülşah Hatun	?-c. 1487	Muradiye Complex in Bursa
Sittişah Hatun	?-1486	Sittişah Hatun Mosque in Edirne
Çiçek Hatun	c. 1442–1498	Cairo
Sultan Bayezid II	1447–1512	Bayezid II Mosque in Istanbul
Şirin Hatun	Unknown	Muradiye Complex in Bursa
Hüsnüşah Hatun	?-c. 1513	Muradiye Complex in Bursa
Nigar Hatun	?-1503	Yivliminare Mosque in Antalya
Gülruh Hatun	Unknown	Muradiye Complex in Bursa
Gülbahar Valide Hatun	c. 1453-c. 1505	Gülbahar Hatun Mosque in Trabzon
Ferahşad Hatun	Unknown	Muradiye Complex in Bursa
Sultan Selim I	1470–1520	Yavuz Selim Mosque in Istanbul
Hafsa Sultan	c. 1478–1534	Yavuz Selim Mosque in Istanbul
Sultan Suleiman I	c. 1476-c. 1539	Süleymaniye Mosque in Istanbul
Mahidevran	c. 1500–1581	Muradiye Complex in Bursa
Hurrem Sultan	c. 1502/1504-1558	Süleymaniye Mosque in Istanbul
Sultan Selim II	1524–1574	Hagia Sophia in Istanbul
Nurbanu Sultan	c. 1525–1583	Hagia Sophia in Istanbul
Sultan Murad III	1546–1595	Hagia Sophia in Istanbul
Safiye Sultan	c. 1550-c. 1619	Hagia Sophia in Istanbul
Sultan Mehmed III	1566–1603	Hagia Sophia in Istanbul
Handan Sultan	?-1605	Hagia Sophia in Istanbul
Halime Sultan	Unknown	Hagia Sophia in Istanbul
Sultan Ahmed I	1590–1617	Sultan Ahmed Mosque in Istanbul
Mahfiruz Hatun	c. 1590-c. 1610/c. 1620	Eyüp Cemetery in Istanbul
Kösem Sultan	c. 1589–1651	Sultan Ahmed Mosque in Istanbul
Sultan Osman II	1604–1622	Sultan Ahmed Mosque in Istanbul
Sultan Murad IV	1612–1640	Sultan Ahmed Mosque in Istanbul
Sultan Ibrahim	1615–1648	Hagia Sophia in Istanbul
Turhan Sultan	c. 1627–1683	Tomb of Turhan Sultan in Istanbul
Saliha Dilaşub Sultan	?-1690	Süleymaniye Mosque in Istanbul
Muazzez Sultan	?-1687	Süleymaniye Mosque in Istanbul
Şivekar Sultan	1627-c. 1647	Hagia Sophia in Istanbul
Sultan Mehmed IV	1642–1693	Tomb of Turhan Sultan in Istanbul
Gülnuş Sultan	c. 1642–1715	Yeni Valide Mosque in Istanbul
Sultan Suleiman II	1642–1691	Süleymaniye Mosque in Istanbul
Sultan Ahmed II	1643–1695	Süleymaniye Mosque in Istanbul
Rabia Sultan	c. 1670–1712	Süleymaniye Mosque in Istanbul
Sultan Mustafa II	1664–1703	Tomb of Turhan Sultan in Istanbul
Saliha Sultan	c. 1680–1739	Tomb of Turhan Sultan in Istanbul
Şehsuvar Sultan	c. 1682–1756	Nuruosmaniye Mosque in Istanbul
Sultan Ahmed III	1673–1736	Tomb of Turhan Sultan in Istanbul
Mihrişah Kadın	?-1732	New Mosque in Istanbul
Şermi Kadın	?-c. 1732	New Mosque in Istanbul
Sultan Mahmud I	1696–1754	Tomb of Turhan Sultan in Istanbul
Sultan Osman III	1699–1757	Tomb of Turhan Sultan in Istanbul
Sultan Mustafa III	1717–1774	Laleli Mosque in Istanbul
Mihrişah Sultan	c. 1745–1805	Mausoleum of Mihrişah Sultan in Istanbul
Sultan Abdul Hamid I	1725–1789	Tomb of Abdul Hamid I in Istanbul
Şebsefa Kadın	c. 1766-c. 1805	Şebsefa Kadın Mosque in Istanbul
Sineperver Sultan	1759/1760-1828	Eyüp Sultan Mosque in Istanbul
Nakşidil Sultan	c. 1761–1817	Mausoleum of Nakşidil Sultan in Istanbul
Sultan Selim III	1761–1808	Laleli Mosque in Istanbul
Sultan Mustafa IV	1779–1808	Tomb of Abdul Hamid I in Istanbul
Sultan Mahmud II	1785–1839	Tomb of Mahmud II in Istanbul
Bezmiâlem Sultan	c. 1807–1853	Tomb of Mahmud II in Istanbul
Aşubcan Kadın	c. 1795–1870	Tomb of Mahmud II in Istanbul
Hoşyar Kadın	?-c. 1859	Mecca
Pertevniyal Sultan	c. 1810–1884	Pertevniyal Valide Sultan Mosque in Istanbul
Sultan Abdulmejid I	1823–1861	Yavuz Selim Mosque in Istanbul
Servetseza Kadın	1823–1878	Yavuz Selim Mosque in Istanbul
Tirimüjgan Kadın	?-1852	New Mosque in Istanbul
Düzdidil Kadın	c. 1825–1845	New Mosque in Istanbul
Şevkefza Kadın	c. 1823–1889	New Mosque in Istanbul
Zeynifelek Hanım	c. 1824-c. 1842	Fatih Mosque in Istanbul
Gülcemal Kadın	c. 1826–1851	New Mosque in Istanbul
Verdicenan Kadın	1825–1889	New Mosque in Istanbul
Nükhetsezâ Hanım	1827–1850	New Mosque in Istanbul
Mahitab Kadın	c. 1830-c. 1888	New Mosque in Istanbul
Nesrin Hanım	c. 1826–1853	New Mosque in Istanbul
Ceylanyar Hanım	c. 1830–1855	Fatih Mosque in Istanbul
Nergizev Hanım	c. 1830–1848	New Mosque in Istanbul
Navekmisal Hanım	c. 1838–1854	New Mosque in Istanbul
Nalandil Hanım	c. 1829-c. 1865	New Mosque in Istanbul
Şayeste Hanım	c. 1836–1912	Şehzade Ahmed Kemaleddin Mausoleum in Istanbul
Serfiraz Hanım	c. 1837–1905	Şehzade Ahmed Kemaleddin Mausoleum in Istanbul
Gülüstü Hanım	c. 1831-c. 1865	Fatih Mosque in Istanbul
Perestu Kadın	c. 1830–1904	Mihrişah Sultan Mausoleum in Istanbul
Sultan Abdulaziz	1830–1876	Tomb of Sultan Mahmud II
Dürrünev Kadın	1835–1895	Tomb of Sultan Mahmud II
Hayranidil Kadın	1846–1895	Tomb of Sultan Mahmud II
Edadil Kadın	?-1875	Tomb of Sultan Mahmud II
Nesrin Kadın	?-1876	Imperial ladies mausoleum, New Mosque, Istanbul
Gevheri Kadın	1856–1884	Imperial ladies mausoleum, New Mosque, Istanbul
Sultan Murad V	1840–1904	New Mosque, Istanbul
Mevhibe Kadın	1844–1936	Ortaköy Cemetery
Resan Hanım	1860–1910	Mehmed Ali Pasha Mausoleum, Eyüp Cemetery, Istanbul
Sultan Abdul Hamid II'	1842–1918	Tomb of Sultan Mahmud II
Nazikeda Kadın	1848–1895	Imperial ladies mausoleum, New Mosque, Istanbul
Bedrifelek Kadın	1851–1930	Yahya Efendi cemetery
Bidar Kadın	1855–1918	Şehzade Ahmed Kemaleddin Mausoleum, Yahya Efendi Cemetery
Dilpesend Kadın	1861–1901	Yahya Efendi Cemetery, Istanbul
Mezidimestan Kadın	1869–1909	Yahya Efendi Cemetery, Istanbul
Emsalinur Kadın	1866–1950	Yahya Efendi Cemetery, Istanbul
Müşfika Kadın	1872–1961	Yahya Efendi Cemetery, Istanbul
Sazkar Hanım	1873–1945	Cemetery of the Sulaymaniyya Takiyya, Damascus, Syria
Peyveste Hanım	1873–1944	Bobigny cemetery, Paris
Fatma Pesend Hanım	1876–1928	Karacaahmet Cemetery, Üsküdar, Istanbul
Behice Hanım	1882–1969	Yahya Efendi Cemetery, Istanbul
Saliha Naciye Hanım	1887–1925	Tomb of Sultan Mahmud II
Sultan Mehmed V	1844–1918	Tomb of Sultan Mehmed V Reşad, Eyüp, Istanbul
Kamures Kadın	1855–1921	Tomb of Sultan Mehmed V Reşad, Eyüp, Istanbul
Mihrengiz Kadın	?-1938	Khedive Tewfik Pasha Mausoleum, Cairo, Egypt
Dürrüaden Kadın	1860–1909	Gülüstü Hanım mausoleum, Fatih Mosque, Fatih, Istanbul
Sultan Mehmed VI	1861–1926	Cemetery of Sulaymaniyya Takiyya, Damascus, Syria
Nazikeda Kadın	1866–1947	Abbas Hilmi Pasha Mausoleum, Abbasiye Cemetery
Inşirah Hanım	1887–1930	Emir Sultan Cemetery, Istanbul
Müveddet Kadın	1893–1951	Çengelköy Cemetery
Nevvare Hanım	1901–1992	Derbent cemetery
Nevzad Hanım	1902–1992	Karacaahmet Cemetery
Caliph Abdulmejid II	1868–1944	Al-Baqi', Medina, Saudi Arabia
Şehsuvar Hanım	1881–1945	Bobigny cemetery
Mehisti Hanım	1890–1964	Brookwood Cemetery, London

== Poland ==
Permanent kingdom from 1320 until 1795. The kings were elected, so many dynasties from Lithuania, Sweden, France, Saxony and Poland were taking turns. Nevertheless, most of them were buried in Kraków.

Name	Born-died	Burial site
Duke Mieszko I	c. 935–992	Cathedral in Poznań
King Bolesław I Chrobry	967–1025	Cathedral in Poznań
King Mieszko II Lambert	990–1034	Cathedral in Poznań
Duke Casimir I the Restorer	1016–1058	Cathedral in Poznań
King Bolesław II the Generous	c. 1042 – 1082	unknown, maybe Benedictine abbey in Tyniec
Duke Władysław I Herman	c. 1042 – 1102	Plock Cathedral in Płock
Duke Bolesław III Wrymouth	1086–1138	Plock Cathedral in Płock
High Duke Władysław II the Exile	1105–1159	unknown, maybe in Altenburg
High Duke Bolesław IV the Curly	1125–1173	Wawel Cathedrale in Kraków
High Duke Mieszko III the Old	1126/7-1202	St. Paul church in Kalisz
High Duke Casimir II the Just	1138–1194	Wawel Cathedrale in Kraków
High Duke Leszek I the White	1186–1227	Wawel Cathedrale in Kraków
High Duke Władysław III Spindleshanks	1165–1231	unknown, probably church in Racibórz or Benedictine monastery in Lubin
Duke Henry I the Bearded	1165/70-1238	Cistercian church in Trzebnica
Duke Henry II the Pious	1196–1241	Franciscan church of St. Jakub in Wrocław
Duke Konrad I of Masovia	1187–1247	Plock Cathedral in Płock
Duke Bolesław the Horned	1220/25–1278	Dominican monastery in Legnica
Duke Bolesław V the Chaste	1226–1279	Franciscan church in Kraków
Duke Leszek II the Black	c. 1241 – 1288	Dominican church in Kraków
Duke Bolesław of Masovia	1253/58–1313	Plock Cathedral in Płock
Duke Henry IV Probus	c. 1258 – 1290	Kolegiata of the Holy Cross and St. Bartholomeus in Wrocław
King Przemysl II	c. 1257–1296	Cathedral in Poznań
King Wenceslaus II Premyslid	c. 1271 – 1305	Cistercian Zbraslav Monastery near Prague
King Wenceslaus III Premyslid	c. 1289 – 1306	Saint Wenceslas Cathedral in Olomouc
King Władysław I	1260–1333	Wawel Cathedral in Kraków
Jadwiga of Kalisz	1266–1339	Clarissine convent in Stary Sacz
King Casimir III	1310–1370	Wawel Cathedral in Kraków
Aldona of Lithuania	1311–1339	Wawel Cathedral in Kraków
Adelaide of Hesse	1324–1371	Augustinian convent in Kassel, Germany
Hedwig of Sagan	1350–1390	Church of the Holy Sepulchre in Legnica
King Louis I	1326–1382	Székesfehérvár Basilica, Hungary
Elizabeth of Bosnia	1340–1387	Székesfehérvár Basilica, Hungary
Queen Jadwiga I	1373–1399	Wawel Cathedral in Kraków
King Władysław II	1348–1434	Wawel Cathedral in Kraków
Anna of Cilli	1380–1416	in the apsis of the Wawel Cathedral in Kraków
Elisabeth of Pilica	1372–1420	Wawel Cathedral in Kraków
Sophia of Halshany	1405–1461	Wawel Cathedral in Kraków
King Władysław III	1424–1444	Wawel Cathedral in Kraków
King Casimir IV	1427–1492	Wawel Cathedral in Kraków
Elisabeth of Austria	1437–1505	Wawel Cathedral in Kraków
King John I Albert	1459–1501	Wawel Cathedral in Kraków, the heart: St. John's Church in Toruń
King Alexander I	1461–1506	Vilnius Cathedral, Lithuania
Helena of Moscow	1476–1513	Cathedral of the Theotokos in Vilnius, Lithuania
King Sigismund I	1467–1548	Wawel Cathedral in Kraków
Barbara Zápolya	1495–1515	Wawel Cathedral in Kraków
Bona Sforza	1494–1557	Basilica di San Nicola in Bari
King Sigismund II Augustus	1520–1572	Wawel Cathedral in Kraków
Elisabeth of Austria	1526–1545	Cathedral of Vilnius, Lithuania
Barbara Radziwiłł	1520–1551	Cathedral of Vilnius, Lithuania
Catherine of Austria	1533–1572	Crypt in Sankt Florian Abbey, Upper Austria
King Henry III	1551–1589	first in St-Corneille, since 1610 in Saint Denis Basilica nearby Paris
King Stefan Batory	1533–1586	Wawel Cathedral in Kraków
Queen Anna	1523–1596	Wawel Cathedral in Kraków
King Sigismund III	1566–1632	Wawel Cathedral in Kraków
Anna of Austria	1573–1596	Wawel Cathedral in Kraków
Constance of Austria	1588–1631	Wawel Cathedral in Kraków
King Władysław IV	1595–1648	Wawel Cathedral in Kraków, the heart: Vilnius Cathedral
Cecilia Renata of Austria	1611–1644	Wawel Cathedral in Kraków
King John II Casimir	1609–1672	Wawel Cathedral in Kraków
Marie Louise Gonzaga	1611–1667	Wawel Cathedral in Kraków
King Michael Korybut	1640–1673	Wawel Cathedral in Kraków
Eleonora Maria Josefa of Austria	1653–1697	Leopold's Vault in the Imperial Crypt in the Kapuzinerkirche in Vienna
King John III Sobieski	1629–1696	Wawel Cathedral in Kraków, the heart: Church of the Transfiguration of Jesus Christ in Warsaw
Marie Casimire Louise de La Grange d'Arquien	1641–1716	Wawel Cathedral in Kraków
King Augustus II the Strong	1670–1766	Wawel Cathedral in Kraków; the heart: Katholische Hofkirche in Dresden
Christiane Eberhardine of Brandenburg-Bayreuth	1671–1727	Parish church in Pretzsch, Germany
King Stanisław I	1677–1766	first in Notre-Dame de Bon-Secours in Nancy, then in Wawel Cathedral in Kraków
Catherine Opalińska	1682–1747	Notre-Dame de Bon-Secours in Nancy
King Augustus III	1696–1763	Crypt in the Katholische Hofkirche in Dresden
Maria Josepha of Austria	1699–1757	Crypt in the Katholische Hofkirche in Dresden
King Stanislas II Augustus	1732–1798	first in St. Petersburg, then in Wolczyn, since 1995 in St. John's Cathedral in Warsaw

== Portugal ==
Kingdom from 1139 until 1910. The list includes all Portuguese monarchs (House of Burgundy, House of Aviz, House of Habsburg and House of Braganza).

Name	Born-died	Burial site
King Afonso I	1109–1185	Santa Cruz Monastery, Coimbra
Maud of Savoy	1125–1158	Santa Cruz Monastery, Coimbra
King Sancho I	1154–1212	Santa Cruz Monastery, Coimbra
Dulce of Aragon	1160–1198	Santa Cruz Monastery, Coimbra
King Afonso II	1185–1223	Alcobaça Monastery
Urraca of León and Castile	1186–1220	Alcobaça Monastery
King Sancho II	1209–1248	Cathedral of Toledo, Spain
Mécia Lopes de Haro	1215–1270	Santa María la Real of Nájera, Spain
King Afonso III	1210–1279	Alcobaça Monastery
Matilda II, Countess of Boulogne	1202–1259	Cistercian Abbey of Gomerfontaine (Trie-la-Ville, Oise department) (?)
Beatrice of Castile	1242–1303	Alcobaça Monastery
King Denis	1261–1325	Monastery of São Dinis de Odivelas
Elizabeth of Aragon	1271–1336	Monastery of Santa Clara-a-Nova, formerly Monastery of Santa Clara-a-Velha, Coimbra
King Afonso IV	1291–1357	Lisbon Cathedral
Beatrice of Castile	1293–1359	Lisbon Cathedral
King Peter I	1320–1367	Alcobaça Monastery
Constanza Manuel	1320–1345	Originally in the Convent of St. Dominic (Convento de São Domingos) in Santarém, transferred by her son Fernando I in 1376 to the Convent of St. Francis (Convento de São Francisco) in the same city.
Inês de Castro	1325–1355	Alcobaça Monastery
King Ferdinand I	1345–1383	Convent of St. Francis (Convento de São Francisco) in Santarem. In 1875, the sarcophagus was moved to the Carmo Archaeological Museum (Museo Arqueológico do Carmo) which occupies the ruined Church of Carmo Convent in Lisbon.
Leonor Teles	1350–1386	Convento de Nuestra Señora de la Merced, Valladolid, Spain
Queen Beatrice (disputed)	1372–1408	Convent of Sancti Spiritus, Toro, Spain
John I of Castile	1358–1390	Toledo Cathedral
King John I	1358–1433	Founder's crypt, Monastery of Batalha
Philippa of Lancaster	1360–1415	Founder's crypt, Monastery of Batalha
King Edward	1391–1438	Monastery of Batalha
Leonor of Aragon	1400–1445	Monastery of Batalha
King Afonso V	1432–1481	Founder's crypt, Monastery of Batalha
Isabel of Coimbra	1432–1455	Monastery of Batalha
Joanna of Castille	1462–1530	Monastery of Santa Clara (destroyed), Lisbon
King John II	1455–1495	Monastery of Batalha
Eleanor of Viseu	1458–1525	Monastery in Xabregas, Lisbon
King Manuel I	1469–1521	Jerónimos Monastery, Lisbon
Isabella of Aragon	1470–1498	Sta. Isabel Convent, Toledo
Maria of Aragon	1482–1517	Jerónimos Monastery, Lisbon
Eleanor of Austria	1498–1558	9th Chapel of the infantes in the Monastery of San Lorenzo El Real in El Escorial
King John III	1502–1557	Jerónimos Monastery, Lisbon
Catherine of Austria	1507–1578	Jerónimos Monastery, Lisbon
King Sebastian	1554–1578	His body was never recovered from the battlefield of Ksar el-Kebir, Morocco; there is a cenotaph in Jerónimos Monastery, Lisbon
King Henry I	1512–1580	Jerónimos Monastery, Lisbon
King Anthony I (disputed)	1531–1595	Cordeliers Convent (destroyed), Paris, France
King Philip I	1527–1598	Pantheon of the kings in the Monastery of San Lorenzo El Real in El Escorial
Maria of Portugal	1527–1545	9th Chapel of the Pantheon of the Infants in the Monastery of San Lorenzo El Real in El Escorial
Elisabeth of Valois	1545–1568	9th Chapel of the Pantheon of the Infants in the Monastery of San Lorenzo El Real in El Escorial
Anna of Austria	1549–1580	Pantheon of the kings in the Monastery of San Lorenzo El Real in El Escorial
King Philip II	1578–1621	Pantheon of the kings in the Monastery of San Lorenzo El Real in El Escorial
Margaret of Austria	1584–1611	Pantheon of the kings in the Monastery of San Lorenzo El Real in El Escorial
King Philip III	1605–1665	Pantheon of the kings in the Monastery of San Lorenzo El Real in El Escorial
Elisabeth of Bourbon	1602–1644	Pantheon of the kings in the Monastery of San Lorenzo El Real in El Escorial
Mariana of Austria	1634–1696	Pantheon of the kings in the Monastery of San Lorenzo El Real in El Escorial
King John IV	1604–1656	first in the Jerónimos Monastery, then in the Royal Pantheon of the House of Braganza at the Monastery of São Vicente de Fora in Lisbon
Luisa de Guzmán	1613–1666	Royal Pantheon of the House of Braganza at the Monastery of São Vicente de Fora, Lisbon
King Afonso VI	1643–1683	first in the Jerónimos Monastery, then in the Royal Pantheon of the House of Braganza at the Monastery of São Vicente de Fora, Lisbon
Maria Francisca of Savoy	1646–1683	First in the French Capucine abbey in Lisbon, then in the Royal Pantheon of the House of Braganza at the Monastery of São Vicente de Fora, Lisbon
King Peter II	1648–1706	Royal Pantheon of the House of Braganza at the Monastery of São Vicente de Fora, Lisbon
Maria Sophia of Neuburg	1666–1699	Royal Pantheon of the House of Braganza at the Monastery of São Vicente de Fora, Lisbon
King John V	1689–1750	Royal Pantheon of the House of Braganza at the Monastery of São Vicente de Fora, Lisbon
Maria Anna of Austria	1683–1754	Royal Pantheon of the House of Braganza at the Monastery of São Vicente de Fora, Lisbon
King Joseph I	1714–1777	Royal Pantheon of the House of Braganza at the Monastery of São Vicente de Fora, Lisbon
Mariana Victoria of Spain	1718–1781	Royal Pantheon of the House of Braganza at the Monastery of São Vicente de Fora, Lisbon
Queen Maria I	1734–1818	first in the Ajuda Abbey in Rio de Janeiro (Brazil), since 1821 in the Basílica da Estrela, Lisbon
King Peter III	1717–1786	Royal Pantheon of the House of Braganza at the Monastery of São Vicente de Fora, Lisbon
King John VI	1767–1826	Royal Pantheon of the House of Braganza at the Monastery of São Vicente de Fora, Lisbon
Carlota Joaquina of Spain	1775–1830	Royal Pantheon of the House of Braganza at the Monastery of São Vicente de Fora, Lisbon
King Peter IV	1798–1834	first in the Monastery of São Vicente de Fora, since 1972 in the Ipiranga Monument in São Paulo (Brazil); the heart: Lapa Church, Porto
Maria Leopoldina of Austria	1797–1826	first in the Ajuda Abbey in Rio de Janeiro, since 1954 in the Ipiranga Monument in São Paulo
Amélie of Leuchtenberg	1812–1873	first in the Monastery of São Vicente de Fora, since 1982 in the Ipiranga Monument in São Paulo (Brazil)
King Michael I	1802–1866	first in the Franciscan abbey in Klein Engelberg Germany, since 1967 in the Royal Pantheon of the House of Braganza at the Monastery of São Vicente de Fora, Lisbon
Adelaide of Löwenstein-Wertheim-Rosenberg	1831–1909	first in the cemetery of St Cecilia's Abbey, Ryde on the Isle of Wight, England; since 1967 in the Royal Pantheon of the House of Braganza at the Monastery of São Vicente de Fora, Lisbon
Queen Maria II	1819–1853	Royal Pantheon of the House of Braganza at the Monastery of São Vicente de Fora, Lisbon
Auguste, Duke of Leuchtenberg	1810–1835	Royal Pantheon of the House of Braganza at the Monastery of São Vicente de Fora, Lisbon
King Ferdinand II	1816–1885	Royal Pantheon of the House of Braganza at the Monastery of São Vicente de Fora, Lisbon
Elise Friedericke Hensler	1836–1929	Prazeres Cemetery, Lisbon
King Peter V	1837–1861	Royal Pantheon of the House of Braganza at the Monastery of São Vicente de Fora, Lisbon
Stephanie of Hohenzollern-Sigmaringen	1837–1859	Royal Pantheon of the House of Braganza at the Monastery of São Vicente de Fora, Lisbon
King Louis I	1838–1889	Royal Pantheon of the House of Braganza at the Monastery of São Vicente de Fora, Lisbon
Maria Pia of Savoy	1847–1911	Basilica of Superga, Turin, Italy
King Charles I	1863–1908	Royal Pantheon of the House of Braganza at the Monastery of São Vicente de Fora, Lisbon
Amélie of Orléans	1865–1951	Royal Pantheon of the House of Braganza at the Monastery of São Vicente de Fora, Lisbon
King Manuel II	1889–1932	Royal Pantheon of the House of Braganza at the Monastery of São Vicente de Fora, Lisbon
Augusta Victoria of Hohenzollern	1890–1966	Langenstein Castle, Orsingen-Nenzingen, Baden-Württemberg, Germany

== Prussia ==
Kingdom from 1701–1918 (since 1871–1918 Prussian King was Emperor of German Reich (personal union). The Prussian kings/German emperors were buried in Berlin and Potsdam, the last emperor in his Dutch exile.

Name	Born-died	Burial site
King Frederick I	1657–1713	Berlin Protestant Cathedral
Elisabeth Henriette of Hesse-Kassel	1661–1683	Berlin Protestant Cathedral
Sophia Charlotte of Hanover	1668–1705	Berlin Protestant Cathedral
Sophia Louise of Mecklenburg-Schwerin	1685–1735	Schelfkirche in Schwerin
King Frederick William I	1688–1740	first in the Garrison Church in Potsdam, then in 1945 in the St Elisabeth Church in Marburg an der Lahn, in 1952 in the Hohenzollern castle and since 1991 in the Friedenskirche in Potsdam
Sophia Dorothea of Hanover	1687–1757	Berlin Protestant Cathedral
King Frederick II	1712–1786	first in the Garrison Church in Potsdam, then in 1945 in the St Elisabeth Church in Marburg an der Lahn, in 1952 in the Hohenzollern castle and since 1991 on the terrace of the Sanssouci Palace in Potsdam
Elisabeth Christine of Brunswick-Wolfenbüttel-Bevern	1715–1797	Berlin Protestant Cathedral
King Frederick William II	1744–1797	Berlin Protestant Cathedral
Elisabeth Christine of Brunswick-Lüneburg	1746–1840	Ducal Castle Crypt, Stettin
Frederica Louisa of Hesse-Darmstadt	1751–1805	Berlin Protestant Cathedral
King Frederick William III	1770–1840	Mausoleum in the garden of Charlottenburg Palace in Berlin
Louise of Mecklenburg-Strelitz	1776–1810	Mausoleum in the garden of Charlottenburg Palace in Berlin
Auguste von Harrach	1800–1873	Mausoleum in the garden of Charlottenburg Palace in Berlin
King Frederick William IV	1795–1861	Sanssouci palace in Potsdam
Elisabeth Ludovika of Bavaria	1801–1873	Friedenskirche in Potsdam
Emperor William I	1797–1888	Mausoleum in the garden of Charlottenburg Palace in Berlin
Augusta of Saxe-Weimar-Eisenach	1811–1890	Mausoleum in the garden of Charlottenburg Palace in Berlin
Emperor Frederick III	1831–1888	Friedenskirche in Potsdam
Victoria, Princess Royal	1840–1901	Friedenskirche in Potsdam
Emperor William II	1859–1941	Mausoleum in Doorn nearby Driebergen, Netherlands
Augusta Victoria of Schleswig-Holstein	1858–1921	Antikentempel in the garden of Sanssouci palace in Potsdam
Hermine Reuss of Greiz	1887–1948	Antikentempel in the garden of Sanssouci palace in Potsdam

== Romania ==
Kingdom from 1866 until 1947.

Name	Born-died	Burial site
King Charles I	1839–1914	Curtea de Arges
Elisabeth of Wied	1843–1916	Curtea de Arges
King Ferdinand I	1865–1927	Curtea de Arges
Marie of Edinburgh	1875–1938	Curtea de Arges
King Charles II	1893–1953	first in São Vicente de Fora in Lisbon, since 2003 in Curtea de Arges
Helen of Greece and Denmark	1896–1982	Greek-Catholic Church in Lausanne, Switzerland. Queen Mother Helen of Romania was reburied at the New Episcopal and Royal Cathedral in Curtea de Argeș on 19 October 2019
Elena Lupescu	1902–1977	first in São Vicente de Fora in Lisbon, since 2003 in the convent cemetery in Curtea de Arges
King Michael I	1921–2017	Curtea de Arges
Anne of Bourbon-Parma	1923–2016	Curtea de Arges

== Russia ==
Tsardom from 1328 until 1721, empire from 1721 until 1917. The lists starts with the Romanov dynasty in 1613. The tsars were first buried in Moscow, later in St Peter and Paul's Cathedral in St Petersburg.

Name	Born-died	Burial site
Tsar Michael I	1596–1645	Cathedral of the Archangel in Moscow
Maria Dolgorukova	?-1625	Cathedral of the Archangel in Moscow
Eudoxia Streshneva	1608–1645	Cathedral of the Archangel in Moscow
Tsar Alexis I	1629–1676	Cathedral of the Archangel in Moscow
Maria Miloslavskaya	1625–1669	Cathedral of the Archangel in Moscow
Natalya Naryshkina	1651–1694	Cathedral of the Archangel in Moscow
Regent Sophia	1657–1704	Smolensk Cathedral at the Novodevichy Convent in Moscow
Tsar Feodor III	1661–1682	Cathedral of the Archangel in Moscow
Agafya Grushetskaya	?-1681	Cathedral of the Archangel in Moscow
Marfa Apraksina	1664–1716	Peter and Paul Cathedral in Saint Petersburg
Tsar Ivan V	1666–1696	Cathedral of the Archangel in Moscow
Praskovia Saltykova	1664–1723	Annunciation Church of the Alexander Nevsky Lavra in Saint Petersburg
Emperor Peter I the Great	1672–1725	Peter and Paul Cathedral in Saint Petersburg
Eudoxia Lopukhina	1669–1731	Smolensk Cathedral at the Novodevichy Convent in Moscow
Empress Catherine I	1685–1727	Peter and Paul Cathedral in Saint Petersburg
Emperor Peter II	1715–1730	Cathedral of the Archangel in Moscow
Empress Anna	1693–1740	Peter and Paul Cathedral in Saint Petersburg
Frederick William, Duke of Courland	1692–1711	Ducal Crypt of Jelgava Palace
Emperor Ivan VI	1740–1764	Unknown
Empress Elizabeth	1709–1762	Peter and Paul Cathedral in Saint Petersburg
Alexei Razumovsky	1709–1771	Annunciation Church of the Alexander Nevsky Lavra
Emperor Peter III	1728–1762	first in the Annunciation Church of the Alexander Nevsky Lavra, since 1796 in Peter and Paul Cathedral in Saint Petersburg
Empress Catherine II the Great	1729–1796	Peter and Paul Cathedral in Saint Petersburg
Emperor Paul I	1754–1801	Peter and Paul Cathedral in Saint Petersburg
Wilhelmina Louisa of Hesse-Darmstadt	1755–1776	Annunciation Church of the Alexander Nevsky Lavra
Sophie Dorothea of Württemberg	1759–1828	Peter and Paul Cathedral in Saint Petersburg
Emperor Alexander I	1754–1825	Peter and Paul Cathedral in Saint Petersburg
Louise of Baden	1779–1826	Peter and Paul Cathedral in Saint Petersburg
Emperor Nicholas I	1796–1855	Peter and Paul Cathedral in Saint Petersburg
Charlotte of Prussia	1798–1860	Peter and Paul Cathedral in Saint Petersburg
Emperor Alexander II	1818–1881	Peter and Paul Cathedral in Saint Petersburg
Marie of Hesse	1824–1880	Peter and Paul Cathedral in Saint Petersburg
Catherine Dolgorukova	1847–1922	Russian Orthodox Cemetery, Nice, France
Emperor Alexander III	1845–1894	Peter and Paul Cathedral in Saint Petersburg
Dagmar of Denmark	1847–1928	first in the Roskilde Cathedral in Denmark, since 2006 in Peter and Paul Cathedral in Saint Petersburg
Emperor Nicholas II	1868–1918	since 1998 in Peter and Paul Cathedral in Saint Petersburg
Alix of Hesse	1872–1918	since 1998 in Peter and Paul Cathedral in Saint Petersburg

== Saxony ==
Kingdom from 1806 until 1918 (before that from 1697 until 1763 in personal union with Poland).

Name	Born-died	Burial site
Elector Frederick Augustus I the Strong	1670–1733	Wawel Cathedral in Kraków; the heart: Founders' Crypt in the Katholische Hofkirche in Dresden
Christiane Eberhardine of Brandenburg-Bayreuth	1671–1727	Paris Church of Pretzsch
Elector Frederick Augustus II	1696–1763	Founders' Crypt in the Katholische Hofkirche in Dresden
Maria Josepha of Austria	1699–1757	Founders' Crypt in the Katholische Hofkirche in Dresden
Elector Frederick Christian I	1722–1763	Founders' Crypt in the Katholische Hofkirche in Dresden
Maria Antonia Walpurgis of Bavaria	1724–1780	Founders' Crypt in the Katholische Hofkirche in Dresden
King Frederick Augustus I	1750–1827	Founders' Crypt in the Katholische Hofkirche in Dresden
Amalie of Zweibrücken-Birkenfeld	1752–1828	Founders' Crypt in the Katholische Hofkirche in Dresden
King Anthony I	1755–1836	Great Crypt in the Katholische Hofkirche in Dresden
Maria Carolina of Sardinia	1764–1782	Great Crypt in the Katholische Hofkirche in Dresden
Maria Theresia of Tuscany	1767–1827	Great Crypt in the Katholische Hofkirche in Dresden
King Frederick Augustus II	1797–1865	King's Crypt in the Katholische Hofkirche in Dresden
Maria Caroline of Austria	1801–1832	Great Crypt in the Katholische Hofkirche in Dresden
Maria Anna of Bavaria	1805–1877	King's Crypt in the Katholische Hofkirche in Dresden
King John I	1801–1873	King's Crypt in the Katholische Hofkirche in Dresden
Amalie Auguste of Bavaria	1801–1877	King's Crypt in the Katholische Hofkirche in Dresden
King Albert I	1828–1902	New Crypt in the Katholische Hofkirche in Dresden
Carola of Vasa	1833–1907	New Crypt in the Katholische Hofkirche in Dresden
King George I	1832–1904	New Crypt in the Katholische Hofkirche in Dresden
Maria Anna of Portugal	1843–1884	Great Crypt in the Katholische Hofkirche in Dresden
King Frederick Augustus III	1865–1932	New Crypt in the Katholische Hofkirche in Dresden
Luise of Tuscany	1870–1947	Hedingerkirche in Sigmaringen

== Scotland ==
See also Great Britain
Kingdom since 843, since 1606 unified with England. The lists starts with the Alpin dynasty in 843. Most of the Scottish kings were buried in the island of Iona, the Dunfermline Abbey and in Holyrood Abbey.

Name	Born-died	Burial site
King Kenneth I	?-858	Iona
King Donald I	812–862	Iona
King Constantine I	?-877	Iona
King Áed	bef. 858–878	Iona
King Giric	?-892	Iona?
King Donald II	?-900	Iona
King Constantine II	bef. 879–952	Iona
King Malcolm I	bef. 900–954	Iona
King Indulf	?–962	Iona
King Dub	?–967	Iona
King Cuilén	?–971	Iona
King Kenneth II	bef. 954–995	Iona
King Constantine III	bef. 971–997	Iona
King Kenneth III	bef. 967–1005	Iona
King Malcolm II	954–1034	Iona
King Duncan I	1001–1040	Iona
King Macbeth	1005–1057	Iona
King Lulach	1030–1058	Iona
King Malcolm III	1031–1093	Tynemouth, later removed to Dunfermline Abbey and then to El Escorial, Madrid;
Margaret of Wessex	1045–1093	Dunfermline Abbey, later removed to El Escorial, Madrid; her head's in Jesuit College, Douai
King Donald III	bef. 1040 – 1099	Dunkeld Abbey, later removed to Iona
King Duncan II	1060–1094	Dunfermline Abbey
King Edgar	1074–1107	Dunfermline Abbey
King Alexander I	1078–1124	Dunfermline Abbey
Sybilla of Normandy	1092–1122	Dunfermline Abbey
King David I	1085–1153	Dunfermline Abbey
Maud, Countess of Huntingdon	1074–1130	Scone Abbey
King Malcolm IV	1141–1165	Dunfermline Abbey
King William I	1198–1249	Arbroath Abbey
Ermengarde de Beaumont	1170–1233	Balmerino Abbey
King Alexander II	1198–1249	Melrose Abbey
Joan of England	1210–1238	Tarrant Abbey, Dorset
Marie de Coucy	1218–1285	Newbottle, Scotland
Queen Margaret	1283–1290	Christ Church, Bergen
King John	1249–1314	probably Hélicourt
King Robert I	1274–1329	Dunfermline Abbey
Elizabeth de Burgh	1289–1327	Dunfermline Abbey
King David II	1324–1371	Holyrood Abbey in Edinburgh
Joan of the Tower	1321–1362	Grey Friars Church in London
King Robert II	1316–1390	Scone Abbey
Euphemia de Ross	?-1387	Paisley Abbey
King Robert III	1340–1406	Paisley Abbey
Anabella Drummond	1350–1401	Dunfermline Abbey
King James I	1397–1437	Perth Charterhouse
Joan Beaufort	1406–1445	Charterhouse in Perth
King James II	1430–1460	Holyrood Abbey in Edinburgh
Mary of Guelders	1434–1463	Holyrood Abbey in Edinburgh
King James III	1451–1488	Cambuskenneth Abbey
Margaret of Denmark	1456–1486	Cambuskenneth Abbey
King James IV	1473–1513	Sheen Priory
Margaret Tudor	1489–1541	Carthusian Abbey of St John in Perth
King James V	1512–1542	Holyrood Abbey in Edinburgh
Madeleine of Valois	1520–1537	Holyrood Abbey in Edinburgh
Mary of Guise	1515–1560	Reims Cathedral
Queen Mary I	1542–1587	Henry VII's Chapel at Westminster Abbey in London
Francis II of France	1544–1560	Saint Denis Basilica nearby Paris
Henry Stuart, Lord Darnley	1545–1567	Holyrood Abbey in Edinburgh
James Hepburn, 4th Earl of Bothwell	1536–1578	Fårevejle Church near Dragsholm Castle in Denmark

== Serbia ==
The historical Serbian monarchy existed as a grand principality (1101–1217), a kingdom (1217–1346), an empire (1346–1371), and several principalities until the Ottoman conquest finalized in 1540. After a series of wars for independence, the Principality of Serbia was formed in 1815 and existed until 1882. The modern Kingdom of Serbia existed from 1882 until 1918, when it was transformed into the Kingdom of Yugoslavia, which existed until 1945.

Name	Born-died	Burial site
Grand Prince Stefan Nemanja	c. 1113 – 1199	Studenica Monastery, Serbia
King Stefan the First-Crowned	c. 1165 – 1228	Studenica Monastery, Serbia
King Stefan Radoslav	c. 1192 – 1235+	Studenica Monastery, Serbia
King Stefan Vladislav	c. 1198 – 1264+	Mileševa Monastery, Serbia
King Stefan Uroš I the Great	c. 1223 – 1277	Sopoćani Monastery, Serbia
Helen of Anjou	c. 1235 – 1314	Gradac Monastery, Serbia
King Stefan Dragutin	c. 1253 – 1316	Đurđevi Stupovi Monastery, Serbia
Catherine of Hungary	c. 1256 – after 1314
King Stefan Milutin	1253–1321	Banjska Monastery, Kosovo; Saint Nedelya Cathedral, Sofia, Bulgaria (relocated in 1460)
Elizabeth of Hungary	c. 1255 – c. 1322
Anna of Bulgaria	? – after 1304
Simonida of Byzantium	c. 1294 – after 1336
King Stefan Konstantin	1282–1322	Zvečan, Kosovo
King Stefan Dečanski	bef. 1282 – 1331	Visoki Dečani Monastery, Kosovo
Theodora of Bulgaria	c. 1290 – 1322	Zvečan, Kosovo
Maria Palaiologina	? – 1355	Skopje, North Macedonia
King Stefan Dušan the Mighty	c. 1308 – 1355	Monastery of the Holy Archangels, Kosovo; Church of Saint Mark, Belgrade, Serbia (relocated in 1968)
Helena of Bulgaria	c. 1315 – 1374
King Stefan Uroš V the Weak	c. 1336 – 1371	Gornje Nerodimlje, Kosovo; Jazak Monastery, Serbia (relocated in the 1690s)
Prince Lazar Hrebeljanović	c. 1329 – 1389	Ravanica Monastery, Serbia
Milica Hrebeljanović	c. 1335 – 1405	Ljubostinja Monastery, Serbia
Despot Stefan Lazarević	1374–1427	Manasija Monastery, Serbia
Prince Miloš Obrenović	1780–1860	Cathedral of Saint Archangel Michael, Belgrade, Serbia
Ljubica Vukomanović	1788–1843	Krušedol Monastery, Serbia
Prince Milan Obrenović	1819–1839	Church of Saint Mark, Belgrade, Serbia
Prince Mihailo Obrenović	1823–1868	Cathedral of Saint Archangel Michael, Belgrade, Serbia
Júlia Hunyady de Kéthely	1831–1919	Vienna Central Cemetery, Vienna, Austria
Prince Alexander Karađorđević	1806–1885	Church of Saint George, Oplenac, Topola, Serbia
Persida Nenadović	1813–1873	Church of Saint George, Oplenac, Topola, Serbia
King Milan I	1854–1901	Krušedol Monastery, Serbia
Natalija Keșko	1859–1941	Cemetery of Lardy, France
King Alexander I	1876–1903	Church of Saint Mark, Belgrade, Serbia
Draga Mašin	1866–1903	Church of Saint Mark, Belgrade, Serbia
King Peter I the Liberator	1844–1921	Church of Saint George, Oplenac, Topola, Serbia
Zorka of Montenegro	1864–1890	Church of Saint George, Oplenac, Topola, Serbia
King Alexander I the Unifier	1888–1934	Church of Saint George, Oplenac, Topola, Serbia
Maria of Romania	1900–1961	Church of Saint George, Oplenac, Topola, Serbia
King Peter II	1923–1970	Church of Saint George, Oplenac, Topola, Serbia
Alexandra of Greece and Denmark	1921–1993	Church of Saint George, Oplenac, Topola, Serbia

== Sicily ==
A County from 1072 until 1130 and a Kingdom from 1130 until 1816. After the extinction in 1409 of the cadet Sicilian branch of the House of Barcelona (heir of the Siculo-Norman Hauteville dynasty and of the Sicilian branch of the House of Hohenstaufen), the kingship was vested in another monarch (personal union) such as the King of Aragon, the King of Spain, the Austrian Emperor and then the kings of the House of Bourbon-Two Sicilies. In 1816 the island Kingdom of Sicily merged with the Kingdom of Naples to form the Kingdom of the Two Sicilies.

Name	Born-died	Burial site
Count Roger I	1031–1101	Most Holy Trinity Abbey, Mileto. Today at the archaeological museum of Naples.
Judith d'Évreux	?–1076	Unknown.
Eremburga of Mortain	?–1087	Most Holy Trinity Abbey, Mileto. Today at the museum of Mileto.
Adelaide del Vasto	1075–1118	Patti Cathedral.
King Roger II	1095–1154	Palermo Cathedral.
Elvira of Castile	1100–1135	Saint Mary Magdalene Chapel in the Palermo Cathedral.
Sibylla of Burgundy	1126–1150	La Trinità della Cava Abbey in Cava de' Tirreni.
Beatrice of Rethel	1130–1185	Saint Mary Magdalene Chapel in the Palermo Cathedral.
King William I	1131–1166	Monreale Cathedral.
Margaret of Navarre	1135–1183	Monreale Cathedral.
King William II	1155–1189	Monreale Cathedral.
Joan of England	1165–1199	Fontevraud Abbey, France.
King Tancred	1138–1194	Basilica La Magione, Palermo.
Sibylla of Acerra	1153–1205	Unknown.
King William III	1186–1194	Unknown.
Queen Constance I	1154–1198	Palermo Cathedral.
Henry VI, Holy Roman Emperor	1165–1197	Palermo Cathedral.
King Frederick (I as King of Sicily and second as Holy Roman Emperor)	1194–1250	Palermo Cathedral; Heart: Foggia Cathedral (destroyed because of the 1731 Foggia earthquake).
Constance of Aragon	1179–1222	Palermo Cathedral.
Isabella II of Jerusalem	1212–1228	Andria Cathedral.
Isabella of England	1214–1241	Andria Cathedral.
King Conrad I	1228–1254	Messina Cathedral. Destroyed during the funeral because of a fire.
Elisabeth of Bavaria	1227–1273	Stams Abbey, Austria.
King Conrad II	1252–1268	Basilica of Santa Maria del Carmine, Naples.
King Manfred	1232–1266	Benevento.
Beatrice of Savoy	1223–1259	Unknown.
Helena Angelina Doukaina	1242–1271	Nocera Inferiore.
King Charles I	1227–1285	Basilica of St Denis, Saint Denis, France.
Beatrice of Provence	1234–1267	Église Saint-Jean-de-Malte, Aix-en-Provence, France.
Margaret of Burgundy	1250–1308	Hospice des Fontenilles, Tonnerre, France.
Queen Constance II	1249–1302	Barcelona Cathedral, Spain.
King Peter I	1239–1285	Monastery of Santa Maria de Santes Creus, Aiguamúrcia, Spain.
King James I	1267–1327	Monastery of Santa Maria de Santes Creus, Aiguamúrcia, Spain.
Isabella of Castile	1283–1328	Notre-Dame de Prière Abbey, France.
King Frederick III	1272–1337	Catania Cathedral
Eleanor of Anjou	1289–1341	Church of San Francesco d'Assisi all'Immacolata, Catania.
King Peter II	1304–1342	Palermo Cathedral
Elizabeth of Carinthia	1298–1352	Church of San Francesco d'Assisi all'Immacolata, Messina.
King Louis	1338–1355	Catania Cathedral.
King Frederick IV	1341–1377	Church of San Francesco d'Assisi all'Immacolata, Messina.
Constance of Aragon	1343–1363	Catania Cathedral.
Antonia of Baux	1355–1374	Messina Cathedral.
Queen Mary	1363–1401	Catania Cathedral.
King Martin I	1374–1409	Cagliari Cathedral.
Blanche I of Navarre	1387–1441	Nuestra Señora de la Soterraña, Santa María la Real de Nieva, Spain.

== Spain ==
The list starts with the unification of the kingdoms of Castile and Aragon under the monarchs Ferdinand and Isabella. After CharlesI (V), almost every Spanish monarch was buried at El Escorial.

Name	Born-died	Burial site
King Ferdinand V	1452–1516	Crypt in the Royal Chapel of Granada
Queen Isabella I	1451–1504	Crypt in the Royal Chapel in the cathedral of Granada
Germaine of Foix	1490–1538	Convent San Miguel de los Reyes in Valencia
Queen Joanna I	1479–1555	first at St Clara in Tordesillas, since 1557 Crypt in the Royal Chapel in the cathedral of Granada
King Philip I	1478–1506	Crypt in the Royal Chapel in the cathedral of Granada; Heart: Augustinerkirche in Vienna
King Charles I	1500–1558	first in San Jerónimo de Yuste, since 1574 in the Pantheon of the Kings in the Monastery of San Lorenzo El Real in El Escorial
Isabella of Portugal	1503–1539	Pantheon of the kings in the Monastery of San Lorenzo El Real in El Escorial
King Philip II	1527–1598	Pantheon of the kings in the Monastery of San Lorenzo El Real in El Escorial
Maria of Portugal	1527–1545	9th Chapel of the Pantheon of the Infants in the Monastery of San Lorenzo El Real in El Escorial
Mary I of England	1516–1558	Westminster Abbey in London
Elisabeth of Valois	1545–1568	9th Chapel of the Pantheon of the Infants in the Monastery of San Lorenzo El Real in El Escorial
Anna of Austria	1549–1580	Pantheon of the kings in the Monastery of San Lorenzo El Real in El Escorial
King Philip III	1578–1621	Pantheon of the kings in the Monastery of San Lorenzo El Real in El Escorial
Margaret of Austria	1584–1611	Pantheon of the kings in the Monastery of San Lorenzo El Real in El Escorial
King Philip IV	1605–1665	Pantheon of the kings in the Monastery of San Lorenzo El Real in El Escorial
Elisabeth of Bourbon	1602–1644	Pantheon of the kings in the Monastery of San Lorenzo El Real in El Escorial
Mariana of Austria	1634–1696	Pantheon of the kings in the Monastery of San Lorenzo El Real in El Escorial
King Charles II	1661–1700	Pantheon of the kings in the Monastery of San Lorenzo El Real in El Escorial
Marie Louise d'Orléans	1662–1689	9th Chapel of the Pantheon of the Infants in the Monastery of San Lorenzo El Real in El Escorial
Maria Anna of Neuburg	1667–1740	9th Chapel of the Pantheon of the Infants in the Monastery of San Lorenzo El Real in El Escorial
King Philip V	1683–1746	Collegiate Church of the La Granja Palace in San Ildefonso
Maria Luisa Gabriella of Savoy	1688–1714	Pantheon of the kings in the Monastery of San Lorenzo El Real in El Escorial
Elisabeth Farnese	1692–1766	Collegiate Church of the La Granja Palace in San Ildefonso
King Louis I	1707–1724	Pantheon of the kings in the Monastery of San Lorenzo El Real in El Escorial
Louise Élisabeth of Orléans	1709–1742	St-Sulpice in Paris
King Ferdinand VI	1716–1759	Salesas Reales Church (Santa Barbara) in Madrid
Barbara of Portugal	1711–1758	Salesas Reales Church (Santa Barbara) in Madrid
King Charles III	1716–1788	Pantheon of the kings in the Monastery of San Lorenzo El Real in El Escorial
Maria Amalia of Saxony	1724–1760	Pantheon of the kings in the Monastery of San Lorenzo El Real in El Escorial
King Charles IV	1748–1819	Pantheon of the kings in the Monastery of San Lorenzo El Real in El Escorial
Maria Luisa of Parma	1751–1819	Pantheon of the kings in the Monastery of San Lorenzo El Real in El Escorial
King Joseph Bonaparte	1768–1844	The Church of the Invalides in Paris
Julie Clary	1771–1845	Basilica Santa Croce in Florence
King Ferdinand VII	1784–1833	Pantheon of the kings in the Monastery of San Lorenzo El Real in El Escorial
Maria Antonia of Naples and Sicily	1784–1806	7th Chapel of the Pantheon of the Infants in the Monastery of San Lorenzo El Real in El Escorial
Maria Isabel of Braganza	1797–1818	7th Chapel of the Pantheon of the Infants in the Monastery of San Lorenzo El Real in El Escorial
Maria Josepha Amalia of Saxony	1803–1829	7th Chapel of the Pantheon of the Infants in the Monastery of San Lorenzo El Real in El Escorial
Maria Christina of the Two Sicilies	1806–1878	Pantheon of the kings in the Monastery of San Lorenzo El Real in El Escorial
Queen Isabella II	1830–1904	Pantheon of the kings in the Monastery of San Lorenzo El Real in El Escorial
Francisco de Asís, Duke of Cádiz	1822–1902	Pantheon of the kings in the Monastery of San Lorenzo El Real in El Escorial
King Amadeo I	1845–1890	Basilica of Superga in Turin
Maria Vittoria dal Pozzo	1847–1876	Basilica of Superga in Turin
Maria Letizia Bonaparte	1866–1926	Basilica of Superga in Turin
King Alfonso XII	1857–1885	Pantheon of the kings in the Monastery of San Lorenzo El Real in El Escorial
Mercedes of Orléans	1869–1878	first in San Juan Chapel in the Basilica of the Monastery of San Lorenzo El Real in El Escorial, since 2000 in the Catedral de la Almudena in Madrid
Maria Christina of Austria	1858–1929	Pantheon of the kings in the Monastery of San Lorenzo El Real in El Escorial
King Alfonso XIII	1886–1941	first in Santa Maria in Monserrato degli Spagnoli in Rome, Italy, since 1980 in the pantheon of the kings in the Monastery of San Lorenzo El Real in El Escorial
Victoria Eugenie of Battenberg	1887–1969	Pantheon of the kings in the Monastery of San Lorenzo El Real in El Escorial
Infante Juan	1913–1993	Pantheon of the kings in the Monastery of San Lorenzo El Real in El Escorial
María de las Mercedes of Bourbon-Two Sicilies	1910–2000	Pantheon of the kings in the Monastery of San Lorenzo El Real in El Escorial

== Sweden ==
The list starts with the Vasa dynasty in 1521. Since the 15th century, almost every monarch was buried in the Riddarholm Church in Stockholm. In the 20th century, the royal Haga cemetery was founded. Queen Christina is the only female monarch who was buried at St Peter's in Rome.

Name	Born-died	Burial site
King Gustav I	1495–1560	Uppsala Cathedral
Catherine of Saxe-Lauenburg	1513–1535	Uppsala Cathedral
Margaret Leijonhufvud	1516–1551	Uppsala Cathedral
Catherine Stenbock	1535–1621	Uppsala Cathedral
King Eric XIV	1533–1577	Västerås Cathedral
Karin Månsdotter	1550–1612	Cathedral of Turku
King John III	1537–1592	Uppsala Cathedral
Catherine Jagiellon	1525–1583	Uppsala Cathedral
Gunilla Bielke	1568–1597	Uppsala Cathedral
King Charles IX	1550–1611	Strängnäs Cathedral
Maria of the Palatinate-Simmern	1561–1589	Strängnäs Cathedral
Christina of Holstein-Gottorp	1573–1625	Strängnäs Cathedral
King Sigismund I	1566–1632	Wawel Cathedral in Kraków
Anna of Austria	1573–1596	Wawel Cathedral in Kraków
Constance of Austria	1588–1631	Wawel Cathedral in Kraków
King Gustav II Adolph	1594–1632	Riddarholm Church in Stockholm
Maria Eleonora of Brandenburg	1599–1655	Riddarholm Church in Stockholm
Queen Christina	1626–1689	Crypt in the St. Peter's Basilica in Rome
King Charles X Gustav	1622–1660	Riddarholm Church in Stockholm
Hedwig Eleonora of Holstein-Gottorp	1636–1719	Riddarholm Church in Stockholm
King Charles XI	1655–1697	Riddarholm Church in Stockholm
Ulrika Eleonora of Denmark	1656–1693	Riddarholm Church in Stockholm
King Charles XII	1682–1718	Riddarholm Church in Stockholm
Queen Ulrika Eleonora	1688–1741	Riddarholm Church in Stockholm
King Frederick I	1676–1751	Riddarholm Church in Stockholm
Luise Dorothea of Prussia	1680–1705	St Martin's Church, Kassel
King Adolf Frederick I	1710–1771	Riddarholm Church in Stockholm
Louisa Ulrika of Prussia	1720–1782	Riddarholm Church in Stockholm
King Gustav III	1746–1792	Riddarholm Church in Stockholm
Sophia Magdalena of Denmark	1746–1814	Riddarholm Church in Stockholm
King Gustav IV Adolf	1778–1837	Riddarholm Church in Stockholm
Frederica of Baden	1781–1826	Crypt of the Grand Dukes in Pforzheim
King Charles XIII	1748–1818	Riddarholm Church in Stockholm
Hedvig Elisabeth Charlotte of Holstein-Gottorp	1759–1818	Riddarholm Church in Stockholm
King Charles XIV John	1764–1844	Riddarholm Church in Stockholm
Désirée Clary	1777–1860	Riddarholm Church in Stockholm
King Oscar I	1799–1859	Riddarholm Church in Stockholm
Josephine of Leuchtenberg	1807–1876	Riddarholm Church in Stockholm
King Charles XV	1826–1872	Riddarholm Church in Stockholm
Louise of the Netherlands	1828–1871	Riddarholm Church in Stockholm
King Oscar II	1829–1907	Riddarholm Church in Stockholm
Sophia of Nassau	1836–1913	Riddarholm Church in Stockholm
King Gustav V	1858–1950	Riddarholm Church in Stockholm
Victoria of Baden	1862–1930	Riddarholm Church in Stockholm
King Gustaf VI Adolf	1882–1973	Royal Haga Cemetery in Stockholm
Margaret of Connaught	1882–1920	Royal Haga Cemetery in Stockholm
Louise Mountbatten	1889–1965	Royal Haga Cemetery in Stockholm

== Westphalia ==
Kingdom from 1807 until 1813.

Name	Born-died	Burial site
King Jérôme Bonaparte	1784–1860	The Church of the Invalides in Paris
Elizabeth Patterson	1785–1869	Green Mount Cemetery in Baltimore
Catharina of Württemberg	1783–1835	Chapel at Ludwigsburg Palace

== Württemberg ==
Kingdom from 1806 until 1918. The kings were buried in Ludwigsburg and Stuttgart.

Name	Born-died	Burial site
King Frederick I	1754–1816	Palace Chapel in Ludwigsburg Palace
Augusta of Brunswick-Wolfenbüttel	1764–1788	Church of Kullamaa in Lääne County, Estonia
Charlotte, Princess Royal	1766–1828	Palace Chapel in Ludwigsburg Palace
King William I	1781–1864	Württemberg Chapel in Stuttgart-Rotenberg
Caroline Augusta of Bavaria	1792–1873	Francis’ Crypt in the Imperial Crypt in the Kapuzinerkirche in Vienna
Catherine Pavlovna of Russia	1788–1819	Württemberg Chapel in Stuttgart-Rotenberg
Pauline of Württemberg	1800–1873	Palace Chapel in Ludwigsburg Palace
King Charles I	1823–1891	Palace Chapel in the Old Palace in Stuttgart
Olga Nikolaevna of Russia	1822–1892	Palace Chapel in the Old Palace in Stuttgart
King William II	1848–1921	Old Cemetery in Ludwigsburg
Marie of Waldeck and Pyrmont	1857–1882	Old Cemetery in Ludwigsburg
Charlotte of Schaumburg-Lippe	1864–1946	Old Cemetery in Ludwigsburg

== Yugoslavia ==
Kingdom from 1882 until 1945. (until 1918 Kingdom of Serbia, until 1921 Kingdom of the Serbs, Croats and Slovenes, and until 1943 Kingdom of Yugoslavia). All kings from the Karadordevic dynasty are buried in the St George's chapel in Topola, Serbia.

Name	Born-died	Burial site
King Milan I Obrenovic	1854–1901	Monastery Church at Krušedol, Serbia
Natalija Keshko	1859–1941	Lardy cemetery, Seine-et-Oise, nearby Paris
King Alexander I Obrenovic	1876–1903	St. Mark's Church in Belgrade, Serbia
Draga Lunjevica	1861–1903	St. Mark's Church in Belgrade
King Peter I	1844–1921	St. George's Church in Oplenac nearby Topola, Serbia
Zorka of Montenegro	1864–1890	St. George's Church in Oplenac nearby Topola
King Alexander I	1888–1934	St. George's Church in Oplenac nearby Topola
Maria of Romania	1900–1961	first in Royal Burial Ground at Frogmore, since 2013 in St. George's Church in Oplenac nearby Topola
Regent Prince Paul	1893–1976	first in Bois-de-Vaux Cemetery, in Lausanne, Switzerland, since 2013 in St. George's Church in Oplenac nearby Topola
Olga of Greece and Denmark	1903–1997	first in Bois-de-Vaux Cemetery in Lausanne, Switzerland, since 2013 in St. George's Church in Oplenac nearby Topola
King Peter II	1923–1970	first in St. Sava Church in Libertyville, Illinois, since 2013 in St. George's Church in Oplenac nearby Topola
Alexandra of Greece and Denmark	1921–1993	first in Royal Cemetery in the park of Tatoi Palace nearby Athens, Greece, since 2013 in St. George's Church in Oplenac nearby Topola
