= Dipold of Acerra =

Duke of Spoleto and Count of Acerra

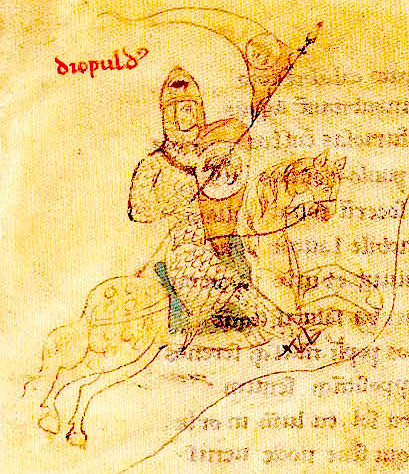
Dipold, Count of Acerra in an illustration from the Liber ad honorem Augusti by Petrus de Ebulo, 1196.

Dipold (Note: Latin variations of his name include Diopuldus, Diubuldus, Diopaldus, Theobaldus, Tebaldus, or Tiboldus de Suinespont or de Rocca Archis. In Italian it is Dipoldo.) (fl. 1191–1221), known in German as Diepold (or Dietpold) von Schweinspünt, (Note: Schweinspünt may be written Schweinspuent to avoid the umlaut.) was a German ministerialis who was raised to the Duchy of Spoleto in 1209. Of Bavarian origin, he was a reputed younger son of Berthold II of Vohburg and Adelaide of Ballenstedt. He was originally a vassal of the count of Lechsgemünd. His career in the Mezzogiorno was marked by continual raids and sieges, battles, and sacks recounted in exhaustive detail by Richard of San Germano, a monk of the abbey whose lands were especially hard hit.

== Early career ==
He accompanied Henry VI, Holy Roman Emperor, to Rome and Sicily in 1191. He was first made castellan of Rocca d'Arce. He made an agreement with the dean of Monte Cassino, Atenulf, and raised a large army. They invaded the lands of the monastery of San Germano, now renamed Cassino, taking the castles of Piumarola and Pignetaro. Dipold defeated a royalist army in pitched battle at Aquino "as a result [his] power increased." In 1191, he captured Richard, Count of Carinola, a former ally of Roger of Andria. During Henry's retreat, Dipold successfully defended the rear from a bridgehead in the Terra di Lavoro.

In the intervening period, Dipold established a base of power in the Campania. He remained mostly on the mainland and acted as Henry's governor there. He strongly supported the regent Markward von Annweiler, but was captured by the count of Caserta. In 1195, he was designated justiciar of the Terra di Lavoro. In 1197, he captured Richard of Acerra and threw him in prison. After turning him over to the emperor, he was granted the county of Acerra. Dipold began increasing his influence through marriage alliances. He married his brother Siegfried to a daughter of the count of Fondi in 1199. He married his daughter to the count of Caserta and his son to a daughter of Peter, Count of Celano.

== Frederick's reign ==
Dipold fought against Walter III of Brienne, a claimant opposed to Henry's son and successor, Frederick I of Sicily. In 1201, Walter defeated and put to flight Dipold on 10 June at Capua. In 1204, he besieged Walter in the fortress of Terracina, but Walter broke the siege and put Dipold to flight. On 11 June 1205, he ambushed and killed Walter while the latter was besieging him at Sarno.

In 1206, Dipold finally convinced the guardian of the young Frederick, William of Capparone, to release the boy to the hands of Walter of Palearia, the chancellor and an ally of the Germans and the Genoese. Capparone, meanwhile, maintained himself in the royal palace until Dipold came to the island and dislodged him. By 1207, Walter, however, distrusted Dipold, who had recently travelled to Rome to be released from excommunication by Pope Innocent III. The chancellor captured him, but Dipold escaped and fled to Salerno, where he entered into open war with Walter and the chancellor's brother-in-law, Peter of Celano. He sorely defeated the men of Naples, allies of Palearia, in May.

== Downfall ==
In exchange for his support, Emperor Otto IV raised Dipold to the title of magister capitaneus totius Apuliae et Terre Laboris and made him Duke of Spoleto between 6 or 10 February 1209. He was incapable, however, of maintaining his authority over his vast territory. In Pisa in November, it was probably he who convinced Otto to invade Sicily.

Dipold fell out with Frederick and the Genoese. In 1218, Frederick sent James of Avellino to arrest him and he was carted back to Germany. According to Alberic of Trois-Fontaines, he was released in 1221 and joined the Teutonic Knights, living many more years. He did not return to Italy and never resurfaces in the chronicles, presumably dying soon after.

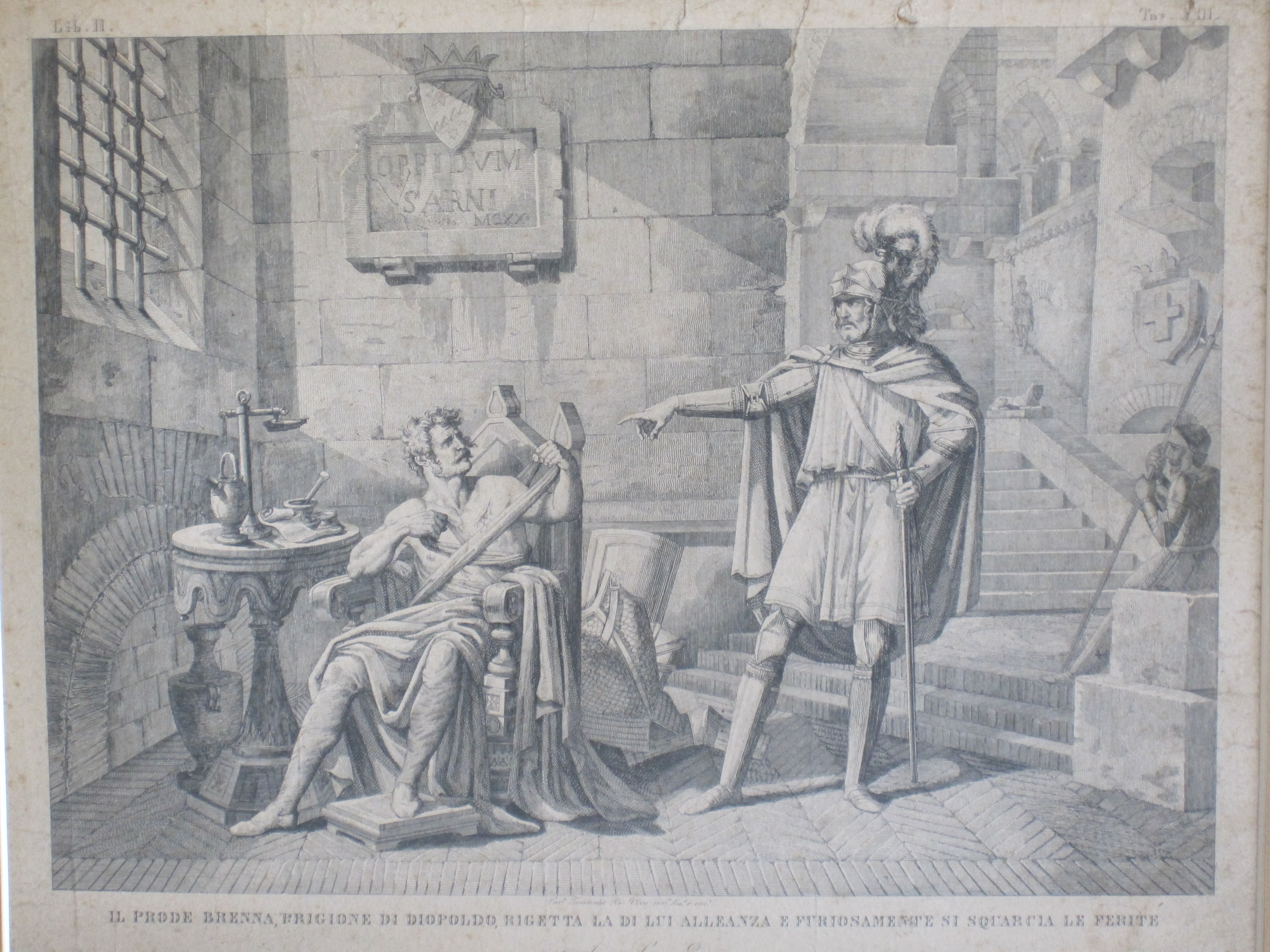
Walter de Brienne and Diopoldo of Vohburg

== Sources ==
- Pavan, Massimiliano (ed). Dizionario Biografico degli Italiani: XL Di Fausto – Donadoni. Rome, 1991.
- Annales Casinenses. Translated by G. A. Loud.
- Mitchell, Roger Haydon (2011). Church, Gospel, and Empire: How the Politics of Sovereignty Impregnated the West. Wipf & Stock.
- Norwich, John Julius. The Kingdom in the Sun 1130-1194. Longman: London, 1970.
- Matthew, Donald. The Norman Kingdom of Sicily. Cambridge University Press: 1992.
- Ryccardi di Sancto Germano Notarii Chronicon. trans. G. A. Loud.
- Riezler, R. Über die Herkunft Dipolds v. Acerra. FDG 16, 1876, 373–374.
- Keupp, Jan Ulrich. "Dienst und Verdienst". Die Ministerialen Friedrich Barbarossas und Heinrichs VI. Stuttgart: Hiersemann, 2002. ISBN 3-7772-0229-0

Italian nobility
Preceded by Richard	Count of Acerra; 1197–1218?	Unknown
Vacant Part of Papal States Title last held by Conrad I	Duke of Spoleto; 1209–1218?	Vacant Part of Papal States Title next held by Rainald
