= Siege of Naples (1191) =

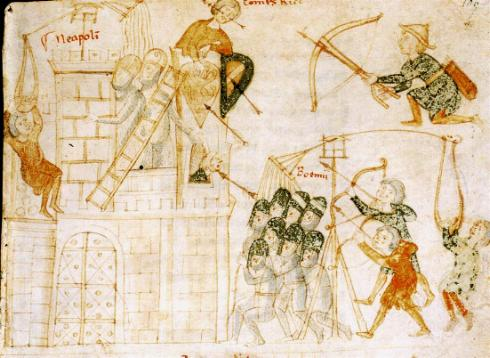
- Siege of Naples in 1191 by the forces of Holy Roman Emperor Henry VI, Peter of Eboli, Liber ad honorem Augusti, Palermo, 1196
Date	May–August 1191 AD
Location	Naples, Italy
Result	Decisive Sicilian victory

Belligerents
Kingdom of Sicily	Holy Roman Empire

Commanders and leaders
Richard of Acerra; Nicholas of Ajello; Aligerno Cottone; Margaritus of Brindisi	Emperor Henry VI; Conrad II, Duke of Bohemia; Philip I, Archbishop of Cologne; Henry III Testa; Henry of Welf

Casualties and losses
	Hundreds

The siege of Naples was a siege in 1191 during the expedition of Henry VI, Holy Roman Emperor aiming to conquer the Kingdom of Sicily in name of the claim of his wife Empress Constance. It lasted three months before Henry abandoned his expedition, after suffering a heavy loss due to disease. After his retreat, the Sicilians set a counterattack that almost reconquered his conquests and captured Empress Constance. It was particularly rare in the history of war that an empress was captured in an imperial offensive campaign.

== Background ==
William II, King of Sicily had no children and he named his aunt Princess Constance, his last legitimate heir, and her husband Henry eldest living son of Emperor Frederick I, as his heirs. However, upon the death of William in 1189, Norman officials did not want to be ruled by Germans, so they elected Tancred, Count of Lecce illegitimate cousin of William as their new king, who was recognized by Pope Clement III. Another candidate for the throne Roger of Andria rose in favor of Constance and Henry, but was executed in 1190; Henry was determined to claim the Sicilian throne but his plan was delayed by the death of his father.

On April 1191 Henry and Constance were crowned at Rome by Pope Celestine III as Emperor Henry VI and empress, and they set an expedition to forcefully take the Sicilian throne from Tancred with the support of the loyal Pisa fleet. By the same month, Richard I of England and Philip II of France denied to aid their new ally Tancred and went on Crusade.

The northern towns of Sicily opened their gates to Henry, including the earliest Norman strongholds Capua and Aversa, as well as Sorella, Atina and Teano; Richard of Fondi, Roger of Molise and William of Caserta all joined the emperor. To gain the support of Pisan fleet Henry renewed their treaty, and with Pisan assistance he laid siege of Naples, where the Sicilian army had concentrated.

== Siege ==
On May the German army reached the wealthy and powerful Naples, where Henry VI met his first resistance in this campaign by its defender Aligerno Cottone and Richard of Acerra brother-in-law of Tancred.

During the siege Salerno, a main capital of Sicily, sent word ahead that Henry was welcome and invited Constance to stay in her father Roger II, King of Sicily's old palace to escape the summer heat, and take treatment from doctors for her infirm health. Nicholas of Ajello, Archbishop of Salerno fled to Naples. When Richard was injured, Nicholas took up the defense of Naples. The fortifications of Naples was strong enough to withstand the repeated attacks; Margaritus of Brindisi, in charge of a fleet of 72 galleys, also came to its aid and managed to harass the Pisan navy, thus keeping the harbor approaches open, so the line of the supply of the city would not be cut off. The citizens of Naples put up a heroic defense that even impressed Henry.

After a siege of three months or six weeks, On August 15 Genoa sent out 33 galleys after Henry VI renewed his promises to call for their aid, but it was too late and Margaritus nearly destroyed them; at the same time the German army suffered from heat, malaria, dysentery, cholera and other epidemics that were aggravated by marshy air, and supply shortages. Conrad II, Duke of Bohemia and Philip I, Archbishop of Cologne died of disease during the siege, and Emperor Henry VI also fell ill. Henry of Welf, who was also participating in the siege of Naples, deserted to Germany and falsely claimed that the emperor had died and tried to underline his own abilities as a possible successor. Pope Celestine III also backed Henry the Lion father of Henry of Welf. Although Henry VI recovered, he ordered to lift the siege of Naples on August 24, with Constance left with a small garrison at Salerno as a sign that he might return to Sicily, while posting other imperial garrisons in all the most important towns and cities.

Only about a tenth of the German army evaded death.

== Aftermath ==
The Sicilian army quickly set a counterattack on the German army and recovered their territory; Richard left Naples and pounced on Capua, where he massacred the Germans left there under Conrad of Lützelhard, and then besieged Roger of Molise in Venafro, then San Germano (now renamed Cassino), and finally the monastery of Monte Cassino itself. The cities that had surrendered to German resubmitted to Tancred to regain his favor. Among them was Salerno, whose populace acted against Constance upon receiving letters from Nicholas before stopped by Sicilian army led by Elia di Gesualdo and Margaritus. Under the condition that the German army accompanying her agreed to leave unharmed, Constance left Salerno to be captured and was delivered to Tancred at Messina.

Henry and his younger brothers Conrad and Philip managed to return to Germany while his subject Dipold also successfully defended the rear from a bridgehead in the Terra di Lavoro, as Tancred was too hesitant that he missed the opportunity to annihilate the invading army. On September 20, Henry was reported the abduction of his wife at Genoa. The Sicilians reconquered Henry's conquests, including Capua. But Henry, who retreated to Milan, still held Monte Cassino, Sora and Rocca d'Arce.

After all Tancred secured his position with the German invasion defeated and his contender Empress Constance captured. Having no intention of killing the empress, Tancred locked her in Castel dell'Ovo surrounded by water in order to take her as a hostage in exchange for Henry VI's agreement to cease the war. In 1192 Tancred appointed Margaritus as the first Count of Malta for his achievements, perhaps involving his unexpected achievement in capturing the empress.

But this victory was of little effect in the long term. In 1192 Tancred was forced to deliver Constance to Celestine III under pressure in exchange for the recognition of the latter who wanted to act as the mediator between him and Henry VI, with Constance intercepted and released on the way by German soldiers; he would die in 1194, months before Henry VI set a second expedition and finally conquered his kingdom, when Aligerno would surrender Naples without resistance.
