= Richard, Count of Acerra =

12th century Italo-Norman nobleman

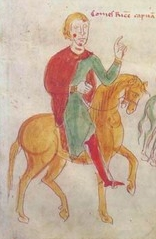

Richard, Count of Acerra (died 30 November 1196) was an Italo-Norman nobleman, member of the noble d'Aquino family and brother of Queen Sibylla of Sicily. Richard was the grandson of Robert of Medania, a Frenchman of Anjou, and the chief peninsular supporter of his brother-in-law, King Tancred, during his claim for the throne in 1189.

== Biography ==
Richard was the co-commander of the army attached to Tancred's fleet in 1185. They captured Durazzo from the Byzantine Empire without a struggle. The city had fully surrendered by June 24. Richard then led his army on a march across the Balkan peninsula and by August 6 he had begun his Siege of Thessalonica. On August 24 Thessalonika fell to Richard's armies in its turn. But Richard was defeated and captured at Battle of Demetritzes.

In 1190, Richard was charged with keeping the German supporters of Roger of Andria out of Apulia. Richard secured all Apulia and the Terra di Lavoro. Richard then "raised a great army of Romans and men from Campania and the Regno to attack the Capuans and Aversans. He invaded the region of Monte Cassino, but at that time the German marshal Henry Testa invaded Apulia and joined with Roger of Andria. Richard fortified Ariano against them. They had much success until the German troops left. Richard then invited Roger to a meeting and treacherously imprisoned him and had him executed soon after. Richard finally turned to Capua at that junction and the city fearfully surrendered without a siege.

Later, when the Emperor Henry VI, the only remaining claimant against Tancred, invaded the Terra di Lavoro, Richard took refuge in Naples. From May to August 1191, Henry invested the city with a siege, and Richard was wounded. When Henry was forced by illness to retire north of the Alps, Richard left Naples and pounced on Capua, where he massacred the Germans left there under Conrad Muscaincervello. Richard then besieged Roger of Molise in Venafro, then San Germano (now renamed Cassino), and finally the monastery of Monte Cassino itself. Those cities had surrendered to Henry resubmitted to Tancred, among them the city of Salerno surrendered Empress Constance, who had been entrusted to them by Henry, to Tancred. By then, Tancred's victory was secure. (Tancred was forced to release Constance in 1192.)

When Tancred died in 1194, Henry quickly marched down the peninsula and had himself crowned in Palermo. Richard "abandoned Campania and Burgentia, the fortresses which he was [still] holding," and tried to flee. He was betrayed (fittingly) by a monk and turned over to the Diepold von Schweinspeunt, who threw him in prison. When, in 1196, Henry arrived in the south, Richard was turned over to him. As Richard of San Germano writes:

He held a general court in Capua, at which he ordered that the count first be drawn behind a horse through the squares of Capua, and then hanged alive head downwards. The latter was still alive after two days when a certain German jester called Leather-Bag [Follis], hoping to please the emperor, tied a large stone to his neck and shamefully put him to death.

Diepold was given the county of Acerra by Henry.

It was also said that Henry hanged Richard in revenge of the capture of Constance.

== Sources ==
- Annales Casinenses. Translated by G. A. Loud.
- Norwich, John Julius. The Kingdom in the Sun 1130-1194. Longman: London, 1970.
- Matthew, Donald. The Norman Kingdom of Sicily. Cambridge University Press: 1992.
- Ryccardi di Sancto Germano Notarii Chronicon. trans. G. A. Loud.
