= Diet of Barletta =

The Diet of Barletta of 1228 was a political assembly convened by Emperor Frederick II of Hohenstaufen in the city of Barletta, in Apulia, which marked the beginning of the Sixth Crusade.

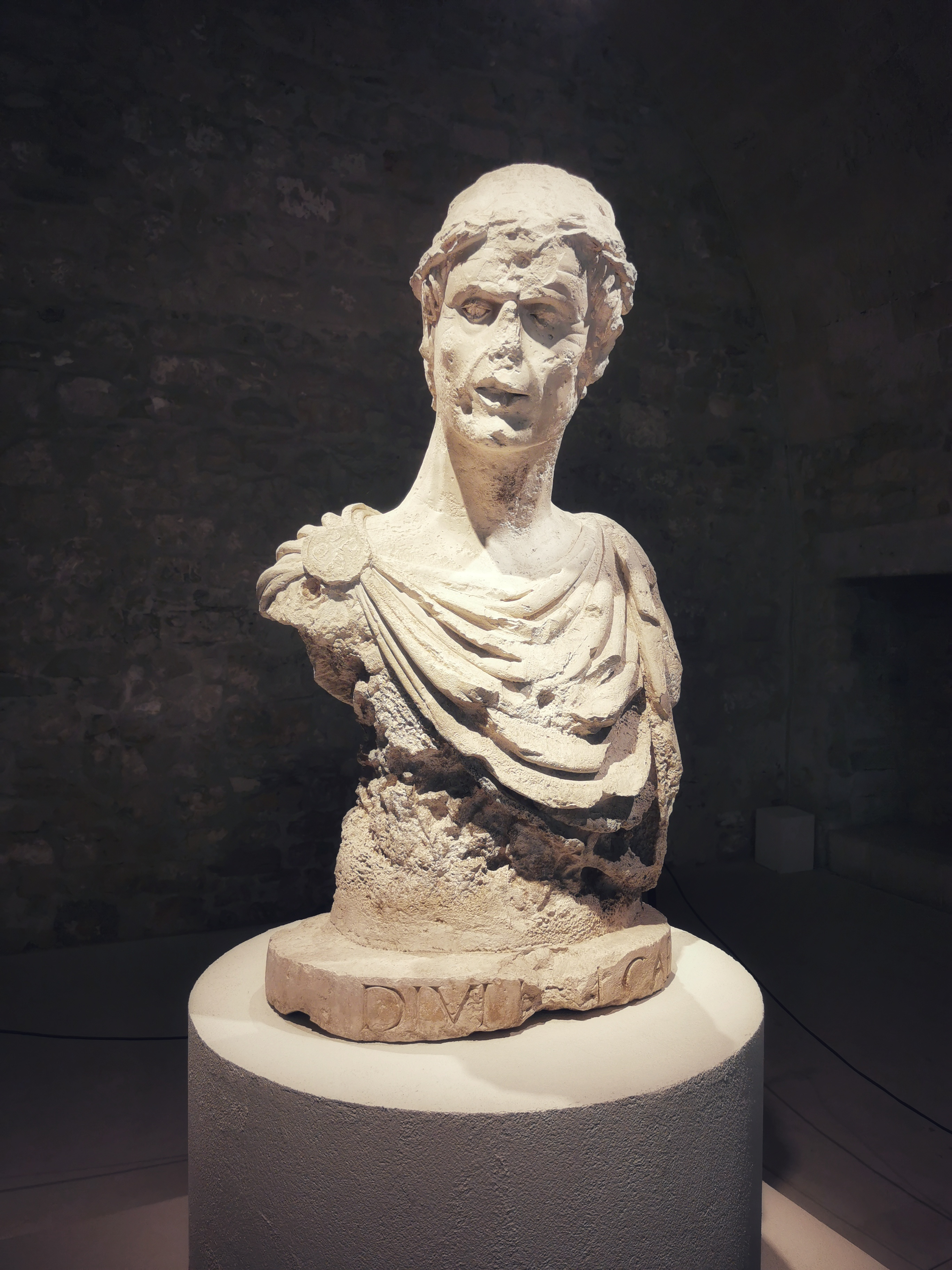
Bust of Frederick II

== Consequences ==
The diet was convened with the primary objective of defining the kingdom's administrative and military issues, at a time of strong tension with the Church of Rome. In fact, Frederick II had to manage the consequences of the excommunication imposed on him by Pope Gregory IX, which resulted from the postponement of his departure for the Crusade in the Holy Land.

Nobles, high dignitaries, and representatives of the demesne cities took part in the important assembly, called upon to ratify reforms of a political, fiscal, and organizational nature necessary for the stability of the State. The choice of Barletta as the seat of the assembly responded to precise strategic logic: its position on the Adriatic coast and the efficiency of its port made it the ideal hub for communications and for the embarkation of contingents headed to the East. It was in this very city that the Emperor celebrated Easter and received important dispatches from the Count of Acerra Thomas of Aquino.

To ensure the continuity of power during his mission, Frederick II adopted crucial measures: he designated Rainald of Urslingen as his vicar and official representative in the Kingdom and formally established that, in the event of his death, the succession to the throne would fall to his son Henry, who had already been invested with the title of King of the Romans.

Some information has reached us, among others, from the chronicler Richard of San Germano.
