= Invasion of Sicily =

Invasion of Sicily may refer to:

- Sicilian Expedition (415–413 BC)
- Roman invasion of Sicily (264 BC)
- Muslim conquest of Sicily (827–902)
- Norman invasion of Sicily (1061–1091)
- Henry VI's conquest of Sicily (1194)
- Aragonese invasion of Sicily (1282–1294)
- Angevin invasion of Sicily (1298–1302)
- Spanish invasion of Sicily (1718–1720)
- Bourbon conquest of the Two Sicilies (1734–1735)
- Expedition of the Thousand (1860)
- Allied invasion of Sicily (1943)

== See also ==
- The Bears' Famous Invasion of Sicily
