= Conrad of Urslingen =

Conrad of Urslingen (German: Konrad von Urslingen) may refer to:

- Conrad I, Duke of Spoleto (r. 1183–1190, 1195–1198)
- Conrad II, Duke of Spoleto (r. 1198–1205), son of prec., duke of Spoleto
- Conrad III, Duke of Spoleto, called Conrad Guiscard (r. 1227–1267), son of prec., duke of Spoleto
