= Walter of Palearia =

Italian bishop and chancelor of Sicily

Walter of Palear (or Palearia, also Gualtiero da Pagliaria; died 1229 or 1231) was the chancellor of the Kingdom of Sicily under Queen Constance and the Emperor Henry VI. He was also the bishop of Troia (1189–1208) and later bishop of Catania (from 1208).

== Biography ==
Walter put Palermo under the authority of his brother, Gentile, Count of Manoppello, while acting as guardian of Henry and Constance's son, the young king Frederick of Hohenstaufen. He "was perhaps the most important man in the kingdom of Sicily during the early years of Frederick's minority".

Gentile surrendered the city to Markward von Anweiler in 1198, but Pope Innocent III alleged that Markward had bribed Walter for the city and the king's regency. In 1202, an army led by Walter and Dipold, Count of Acerra, was defeated by the claimant Walter III of Brienne, who opposed Frederick as king. Markward died at a town called Patti having succumbed to surgery for kidney stones. After Markward's death, Frederick fell under the control of William of Capparone. Dipold wrested Frederick from Capparone in 1206 and gave him over to the guardianship of the chancellor. Walter and Dipold then had a falling-out and the latter captured the royal palace, where he was besieged and captured by Walter in 1207.

Walter participated in the latter part of the Fifth Crusade. He was sent by Frederick alongside Henry, Count of Malta and German imperial marshal Anselm of Justingen to Damietta, after its recent capture. After the dismal failure of the crusade and the surrender of Damietta to Al-Kamil, Walter was one of the many Christian leaders to suffer a humiliating blow to his repuation. He stripped of his possessions and sent into exile.

Rainaldo di Celano, the archbishop of Capua, was his nephew.

== Sources ==
- Kantorowicz, Ernst. Frederick the Second. Frederick Ungar Publishing Company: 1937.
- Matthew, Donald. The Norman Kingdom of Sicily. Cambridge University Press: 1992.
- Ryccardi di Sancto Germano Notarii Chronicon. G. A. Loud, trans.
