= Henry of Kalden =

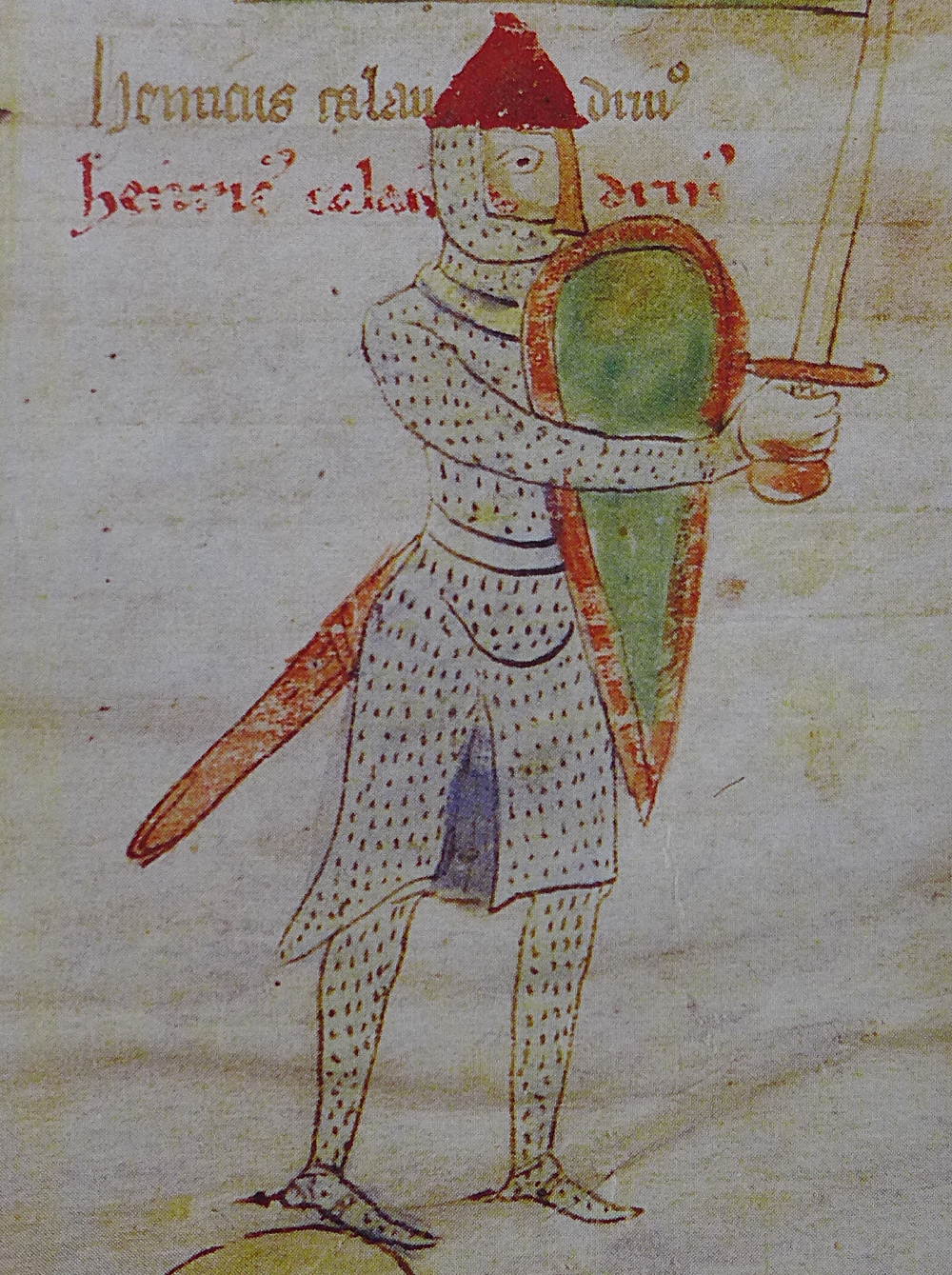
Henry of Kalden, depicted in the Liber ad honorem Augusti by Peter of Eboli, 1196

Henry of Kalden (German: Heinrich von Kalden; c. 1175 – after 1214) was a ministerialis in the service of the German kings Henry VI, Philip, Otto IV, and Frederick II.

== Life ==
Henry probably was a son of the Franconian noble Henry III Testa of Pappenheim, Imperial marshal of the Hohenstaufen emperor Frederick Barbarossa. Historians have speculated whether Henry Testa and Henry of Kalden are one and the same person, though recent research tends to the assumption of a father-son relationship. They are also rated as the builders of Kaltenburg Castle, erected between 1150 and 1180.

The Pappenheim dynasty had held the hereditary marshal office since about 1100. Henry Testa was one of the leaders of the Third Crusade and is documented serving Emperor Frederick's son and successor Henry VI, while the latter was yet just King of the Romans, in his 1190/91 campaign to the Sicilian kingdom as his right by marriage to the Norman princess Constance. He participated in the unsuccessful siege of Naples, before intense summer heat, epidemics and supply shortages caused the Imperial troops to leave the siege early. Henry Testa returned to Germany, and presumably died in 1191 at Monte Cassino.

Henry von Kalden succeeded his father as Imperial marshal in the service of Emperor Henry VI. In 1194, when Henry VI finally subdued the peninsula and could invade Sicily, his marshal was with him. Back in Germany, he spent Christmas 1195 with the emperor at the Imperial Palace of Hagenau. Henry of Kalden was again sent to Catania, where he and Markward von Annweiler defeated a large resistance army of Sicilian nobles in 1197, sacked the city and took captive its bishop. Henry was one of the leaders of the Crusade of 1197 and led the Imperial army to Acre in September, however, the German princes denied his authority and chose Duke Henry of Brabant as commander. Nevertheless, when the crusaders heard of Emperor Henry's death in Messina, they had to return to Germany in order to secure their hereditary estates.

Henry remained a loyal supporter of the Hohenstaufen dynasty and entered the service of Henry VI's brother and successor in Germany, Duke Philip of Swabia. In the throne quarrel with the Welf prince Otto IV, he aided Philip against the forces of Landgrave Hermann of Thuringia in 1204 and against the Cologne citizens in 1206, as well as in the negotiations with Pope Innocent III.

On 8 June 1208, however, Philip was murdered out of rage by the Bavarian count palatine Count Otto VIII of Wittelsbach. Henry of Kalden received permission from the Pope to track down and kill Otto to avenge his master's death. Granted, Henry killed him at Oberndorf, on the Danube, near Regensburg, and cut off his head. He nevertheless accepted the new circumstances and joined the side of the recently crowned Emperor Otto IV, whose closest advisor he became, arranging Otto's marriage with Philip's daughter Beatrice and moulding an aggressive Sicilian policy.

After the December 1212 coronation of Henry VI's son Frederick II, however, Otto's position worsened and the marshal returned to the Hohenstaufen fold. He is last documented in 1214 deeds.

== Sources ==
- Annales Casinenses. Translated by G. A. Loud.
- Ottonis de Sancto Blasio Chronica. Translated by G. A. Loud.
- Ryccardi di Sancto Germano Notarii Chronicon. Translated by G. A. Loud.
- Norwich, John Julius. The Kingdom in the Sun 1130-1194. Longman: London, 1970.
- Matthew, Donald. The Norman Kingdom of Sicily. Cambridge University Press: 1992.

Henry of Kalden Pappenheim Born: c. 1175 Died: after 1214
German royalty
Preceded by Henry Testa	Marshal of the Holy Roman Empire; 1191–1214	Succeeded by Ludwig I, Duke of Bavaria
