= Luigi Torro =

Italian painter

Luigi Torro (1836–1900) was an Italian painter.

Torro was born in Lauro, Terra di Lavoro, near Naples. After first studying literature and history locally, he traveled to Naples to study painting at the Academy under professor Giuseppe Mancinelli; from there he moved to Rome and entered the studio of professor Francesco Coghetti. He then traveled outside of Italy; while he was residing in Paris in 1859, war between Savoy and Austria erupted, and Toro returned to Italy to fight as a volunteer in the cacciatori delle Alpi (Hunters of the Alps). He stayed with the military forces, and was nominated to lead militia fighting brigands in Terra di Lavoro. In 1860, he was one of the first followers of Garibaldi to enter Calabria.

His experience in the wars of independence provided him with ample subjects for his art. He painted two genre scenes about the fighting brigands, La messe and Il pasto dei villani. In 1861 he painted two oil canvases, the Guide esploratrici and the Entrance of Garibaldini to Calabria. In 1870, he opened a studio in Rome. Later in life he painted many genre country scenes. His masterwork was a painting of The philosopher Agostino Nifo of Sessa before the King of Naples (Charles V of Spain), which was once displayed at the Pinacoteca of Capodimonte.
