= Roger of Andria =

Claimant to the Sicilian throne in 1189

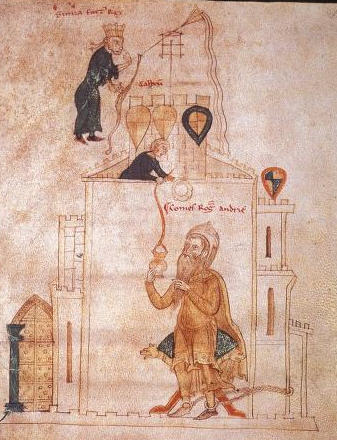
Tancred, depicted as a monkey, enjoys the imprisonment of Roger, his chief enemy in this illumination from the Liber ad honorem Augusti of Peter of Eboli (1196).

Roger, count of Andria and Great Chamberlain of Sicily, was a claimant for the Sicilian throne after the death of William II in 1189. He is claimed by some to have been a great-grandson of Drogo of Hauteville, but this cannot be proven.

Roger, along with Romuald Guarna, Archbishop of Salerno, was sent by William in 1177 to attend discussions in Venice following the Emperor Frederick Barbarossa's defeat at Legnano—a victory in which Roger had participated—in the previous year. Together, the Sicilian envoys assented to the Treaty of Venice.

Roger initially resisted the claims of Tancred of Lecce in favour of those of Constance, daughter of Roger II, and wife of Henry VI, son of Barbarossa, though he was a candidate himself. He had most of the barons of the peninsula on side, but Tancred's chancellor, Matthew of Ajello, was spreading sordid tales of his private life and the count's support eroded fast. Roger joined with Count Richard of Carinola and Henry Testa, the marshal of Henry VI, and invaded Apulia. They captured Corneto, but at the siege of Ariano, Richard, Count of Acerra, tricked the count of Andria and captured him (1190). He executed him soon after.

== Sources ==
- Annales Casinenses. Translated by G. A. Loud.
- Norwich, John Julius. The Kingdom in the Sun 1130-1194. Longman: London, 1970.
