= Markward von Annweiler =

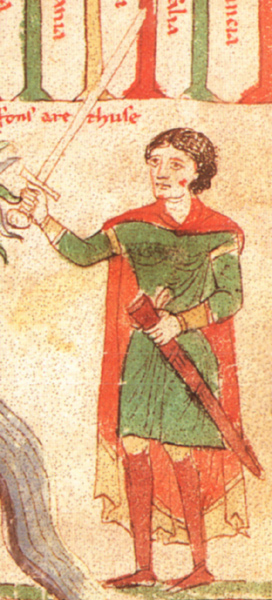
Markward von Annweiler in an illustration from the Liber ad honorem Augusti by Peter of Eboli, 1196.

Markward von Annweiler (fl. 1184 – died 1202) was Imperial Seneschal and Regent of the Kingdom of Sicily.

== Biography ==
Markward was a ministerialis, that is, he came not from the free nobility, but from a class of unfree knights and administrators whose purpose was to serve loyally the Imperial administration in any capacity. During the reign of the Emperor Frederick Barbarossa, Markward became one of the most important figures in the administration.

Markward can be proved at the latest since the Diet of Pentecost. From 1184, Markward served Barbarossa's son Henry VI in Italy. Henry appointed him Margrave of Ancona and Count of Abruzzo, placing him in a highly strategic position in north-central Italy. After the death of Henry, Markward at first supported his widow Constance of Sicily, but later found himself her enemy. He landed in Trapani in October 1199 and opposed the bishops appointed by the pope by allying with the Genoese corsairs and the Arabs. For this, he was excommunicated by Celestine III and Innocent III, who coveted his possessions in central Italy.

Markward became a supporter of Philip of Swabia, the brother of Henry, and then in 1199 he allied with Muslim groups established in Sicily. In the same year, the pope proclaimed, in the name of the young Frederick II, a crusade against him, claiming that he had made an unholy alliance with the Saracens of Sicily. Markward's political and military activities caused great problems for the Popes, whose control of Sicily gradually weakened. Two years after Constance's death, Philip gave Markward the lordship of Palermo, where the under-age heir, the future Emperor Frederick II, was resident. Despite the opposition of Innocent III, Markward became Guardian of Frederick II and Regent of Sicily. However, Markward died within a few years. Markward died at a town called Patti having succumbed to surgery for kidney stones.

He was succeeded in Palermo by William of Capparone.

== Sources ==
- Frétigné, Jean-Yves (2018). Histoire de la Sicile. Pluriel / Fayard.
- Phillips, Jonathan (2010). Une histoire moderne des croisades. Flammarion.
