= Konrad of Lützelhard =

Konrad von Lützelhardt (fl. 1177 - died 1197) was a German noble and Margrave of Ancona in the 12th century.

== Biography ==
Konrad von Lützelhardt came from the ministerialis family of Lützelhardt in Swabia, loyal to the German Emperor.

When the Sicilian nobles elevated Tancred of Lecce to King of Sicily in 1190, Conrad supported the claims of Henry VI, Holy Roman Emperor to the Sicilian throne by force of arms.

In 1177, he was made Margrave of Ancona. In 1192, Konrad failed to defend Capua against Richard, Count of Acerra. At the same time, Konrad was active as the imperial administrator of Etruria.

In 1193, he took over command of the campaign against Tancred in Apulia and also in the following year he led the Swabian contingent of Henry VI's army in Italy. In 1195, the Emperor made him Count of Molise. He died in 1197.

His adversaries gave him the nickname Musca in cerebro (Italian : Muscaincervello, which means fly in the brain), because “eo quod plerumque quasi demens videretur” (he usually looked pretty crazy).

== Sources ==
- Peter Csendes: Heinrich VI., Primus Verlag Darmstadt 1993. ISBN 3-89678-023-9
- Alemannische Seiten.de¨
