= Henry VI's conquest of Sicily =

1194 conquest led by Holy Roman Emperor

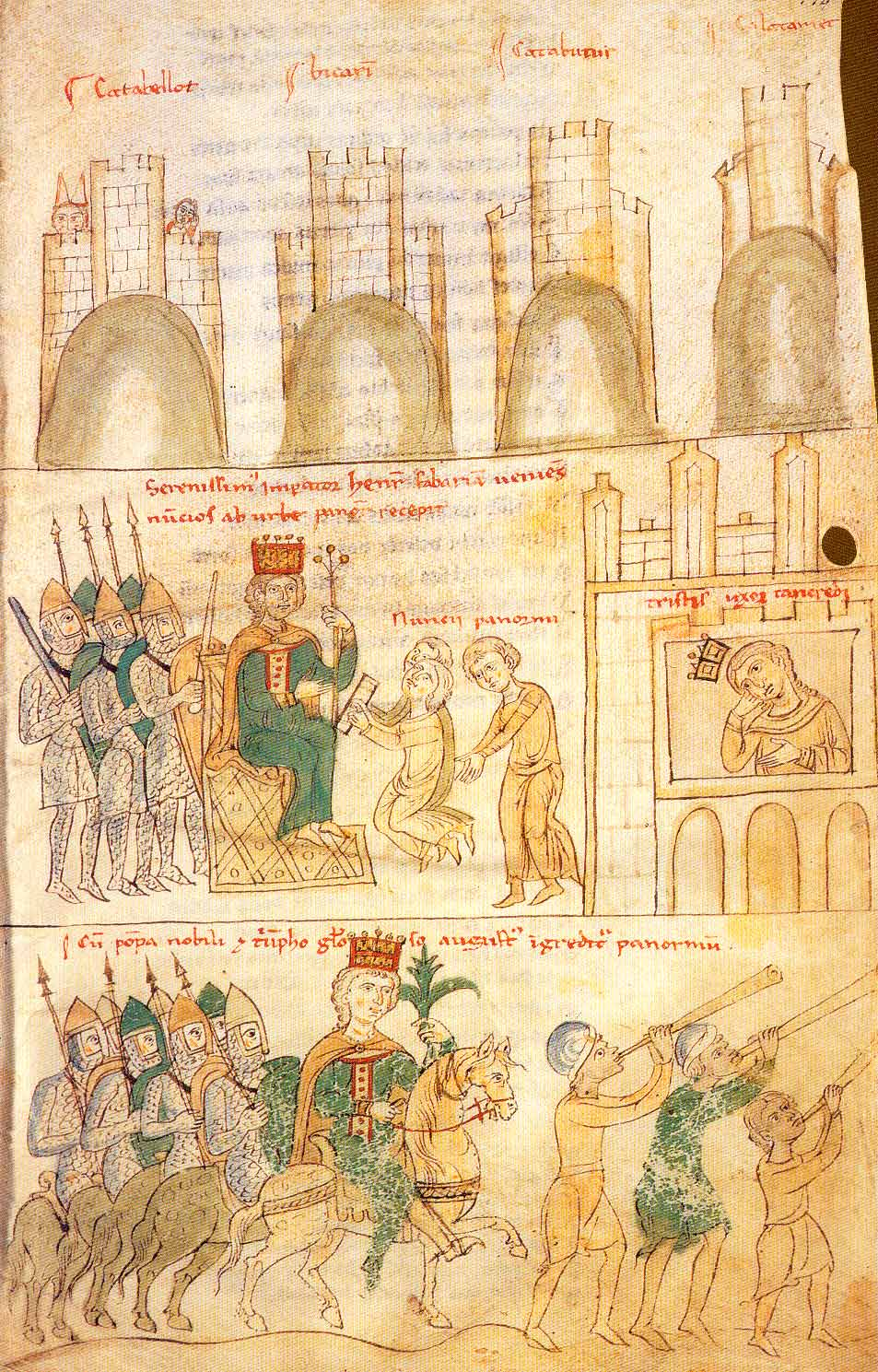
- Henry VI entering Palermo
Date	1194
Location	Sicily, Southern Italy
Result	Imperial victory
Territorial changes	Kingdom of Sicily added to Henry VI's Personal Union

Belligerents
Kingdom of Sicily	Holy Roman Empire

Commanders and leaders
(Kingdom of Sicily) William III of Sicily (POW)	(Holy Roman Empire) Henry VI

Strength
Unknown	Unknown

Casualties and losses
Unknown	Unknown

Holy Roman Emperor Henry VI conquered the Kingdom of Sicily in the name of his wife, Constance I, in 1194.

== Background ==
William II of Sicily had stated that, should he die without having any children, he wished to be succeeded by his aunt Constance. However, Constance was married to Henry VI, a member of the Hohenstaufen family that was widely disliked within Italy. Because Constance was connected to the Hohenstaufen family, William's cousin Tancred of Lecce seized the Sicilian throne instead after William died in 1189. Henry ascended to the title of Holy Roman Emperor in 1190, and the following year, he and Constance led an invasion of Sicily to inherit the kingdom. The 1191 invasion failed due to pressure from Italian citizens and military failures, culminating in the 1191 siege of Naples, during which Constance was captured.

== Conquest ==
After Tancred's death in February 1194, the throne of Sicily passed to his young son, William III. Henry capitalized on the change in ruler to launch a second invasion of Sicily that May. This time, the conquest proceeded smoothly: Henry's forces occupied Naples in August and entered the Sicilian capital of Palermo on 20 November 1194. William III was tortured and blinded, and Henry VI assumed the kingship of Sicily.
