= Philip I (archbishop of Cologne) =

Philip I (German: Philipp von Heinsberg) (c. 1130 – 13 August 1191) was Archbishop of Cologne and Archchancellor of Italy from 1167 to 1191.

He was the son of Count Goswin II of Heinsberg and Adelaide of Sommerschenburg. He received his ecclesiastical training in Cologne and Reims, becoming dean of the cathedral chapter in Cologne and then provost of Liège. In the late summer of 1167 he was promoted to the archchancellorship and archdiocese of Cologne, where he was consecrated on 29 September 1168. That year he intervened and mediated in the dispute between France and England.

As bishop, Philip continued the policies of his predecessors. However, he surpassed them all in territorial expansion, buying up the lands of his vassals and selling many of them at a profit. Philip held his fief directly from the emperor and was the greatest of the imperial lords. By buying up his vassals, he tied them more closely to himself. Frederick Barbarossa, however, saw the archbishop's claims as a threat and allied himself with the competing baronial factions in the region, notably Henry IV of Luxembourg, who had a hereditary claim to Hainaut. Barbarossa also made Aachen and Duisburg royal cities with trading privileges in order to weaken Cologne economically.

Nevertheless, Philip remained a supporter of Frederick. As archchancellor, he campaigned with him in Italy on several occasions. He was present at the disastrous Battle of Legnano on 29 May 1176, where Barbarossa's Italian ambitions were crushed on the field. On 13 April 1180, Philip became Duke of Westphalia when the old Duchy of Saxony was dissolved following the deposition of Henry the Lion. With Westphalia under his control, Philip was the most powerful lord in the north of the empire, threatening the power and influence of the emperor. At the Diet of Pentecost in Mainz in 1184, he raised Baldwin V of Hainaut to the rank of margrave. Philip responded by negotiating with Pope Urban III, then at odds with Barbarossa, and Canute IV of Denmark. He also supported the old Count of Luxembourg, who had claims to Hainaut. Philip also supported the anti-imperial candidate for the archbishopric of Trier, Folmar of Karden, and built a fortress at Zeltingen for this purpose, but the archbishop's wider attempts to unite the German episcopate against the emperor failed.

Around Whitsun 1187, Philip defeated an imperial army on its way to oppose Philip II of France. The emperor formally accused the archbishop of disloyalty. In March 1188, Philip submitted to the emperor at a council in Mainz. He made peace the following year (1189). In 1190 Philip again played a political role, this time mediating between Barbarossa and Henry the Lion. In 1191 Philip accompanied the new emperor Henry VI to Italy to conquer the kingdom of Sicily on behalf of his wife Constance, and died of an epidemic – either bubonic plague or malaria – during the siege of Naples. His body was returned to Cologne.

Philip had been responsible for several public works during his lifetime. In 1180, he began on work Cologne's city wall. Documents dated 27 July and 18 August of that year attest to the start of work on what was to become the largest city wall in Europe until 1881. He also began work on the Shrine of the Three Kings, where one of his coins was found (1864).

Philip I House of Heinsberg Born: ca. 1130 Died: 13 August 1191 near Naples
Preceded by Rainald of Dassel	Archbishop of Cologne; 1167–1191	Succeeded by Bruno of Berg
New title Division of Saxony	Duke of Westphalia and Angria; 1180–1191	Succeeded by Bruno of Berg
