= Alamanikon =

Tax levied by Byzantine Empire

The Alamanikon (Byzantine Greek: Ἀλαμανικόν, 'German tax'), was a tax levied by the Byzantine emperor, Alexios III, in 1197 in order to pay the Holy Roman Emperor, Henry VI, a tribute of 1,600 pounds of gold.

Henry had originally demanded 5,000 pounds from Alexios after Alexios usurped the throne from Alexios's brother Isaac II in 1195. Henry, after his conquest of the Kingdom of Sicily, had taken custody of Isaac's daughter, Irene Angelina, widow of Roger III of Sicily. He proceeded to marry her to his younger brother Philip, Duke of Swabia, and proclaim himself the defender of his brother's rights in Byzantium through his wife. He threatened to invade Alexios's empire unless he received tribute.

In order to get support for taxing Constantinople, Alexios called a meeting of the Senate, the clergy (mostly drawn from the bureaucratic class) and the members of the trade guilds (the professional class). He proposed a property assessment of the assembled classes, but they rejected it as being contrary to custom. The assembly became riotous, accusing Alexios of wasting public money and imposing his incompetent relations, including men who had been blinded, as governors of the provinces. After abandoning the planned tax, Alexios tried to collect those gold and silver objects of the churches' that were not used in services. The clergy continued to resist, this being the only time in Alexios's reign that they opposed him. Alexios finally abandoned the idea of a tax on the capital and took the gold and silver from the tombs of his predecessors. Only that of Constantine the Great was spared.

Although the capital had exempted itself, the Alamanikon continued to be collected in the provinces. The total collection came to 7,000 pounds of silver and some gold, but because of the death of Henry VI on 28 September 1197 the tribute was never sent. Although later chroniclers, such as Niketas Choniates, claimed that Henry's crusade was actually intended to subjugate Byzantium, there is no contemporary evidence to suggest this.

== Sources ==
- Brand, Charles M. (1968). Byzantium Confronts the West, 1180–1204. Cambridge, Massachusetts: Harvard University Press. LCCN 67-20872.
- Brand, Charles M. (1991). "Alamanikon". In Kazhdan, Alexander (ed.). The Oxford Dictionary of Byzantium. Oxford and New York: Oxford University Press. pp. 50–51. ISBN 0-19-504652-8.
- Fuhrmann, Horst (1986). Germany in the High Middle Ages: c.1050–1200. Cambridge: Cambridge University Press.
