= Diet of Pentecost =

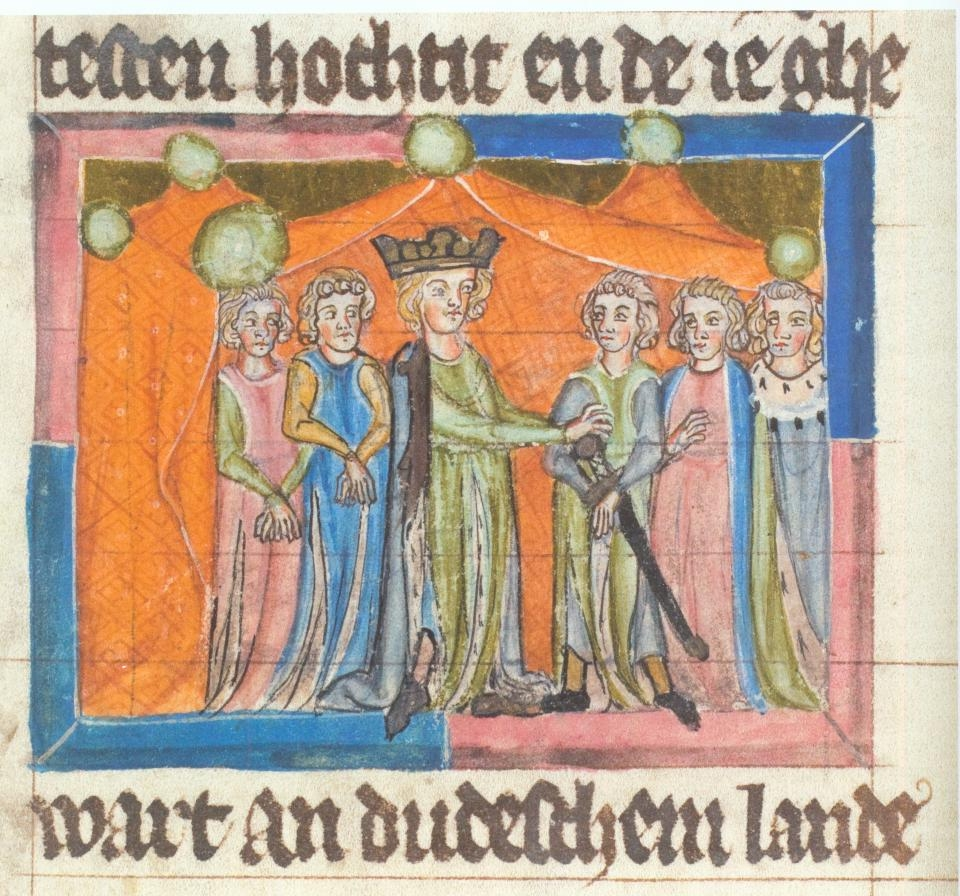
Depiction of the Diet of Mainz in 1184 in theSächsische Weltchronik, Northern Germany, First Quarter 14th Century, Berlin, State Library of Prussian Cultural Heritage.

The Mainzer Hoffest (literally "Mainz court festival") or Diet of Pentecost was a Hoftag (imperial diet) of the Holy Roman Empire started in Mainz on 20 May 1184. It was organised by Emperor Frederick I on the island of Maaraue in front of Mainz in the mouth of the Main on the occasion of Pentecost. Due to its large number of visitors and its cultural pleasures, it represented a highlight of the knightly way of life and the development of power of the dynasty of Hohenstaufen.

== Preparation ==
In 1183, after successes in Italian politics and the subjugation of Henry the Lion at the beginning of the 1180s, Emperor Frederick I announced a court day in Mainz for the following year. A city of wooden buildings and tents was to be built especially for the court day. In its centre the palace of the emperor and a church were built. Since the Court Day had already been announced a year in advance, French, Spanish, English, Italian and Balkan visitors were able to arrive in addition to visitors from the imperial territories north of the Alps.

== Festivities ==
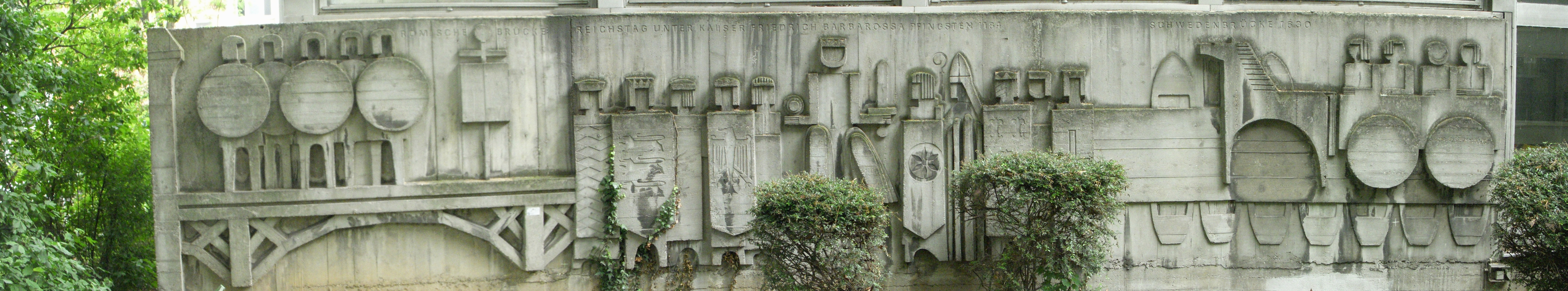
Modern concrete relief on the building of the Hochschule Mainz in Rheinstraße 19: Diet of Pentecost

The Diet of Mainz began on 20 May 1184. Pentecost high mass was celebrated in the wooden church with the participation of the crowned imperial couple. The Emperor's swordbearer was the Count of Hainaut. The Chancellor of the Count of Hainaut, Gislebert of Mons, retrospectively claimed that there had been a dispute among the most powerful princes over the right to carry a sword and that it had ultimately been left to the Count of Hainaut, since he had been highly celebrated and related to many of the princes present. While research partly followed this judgement and noted that the emperor wanted to show the count his favour on the Lower Rhine because of his strategic importance, ritual research came to a different conclusion. Since there is no evidence that the princes had ever argued about this service before, it is assumed that the Count of Hainaut was forced to carry a sword as a symbolic form of classification into the ruling system, especially since he was also elevated to the rank of Imperial Prince at court day (Gerd Althoff).

Following his entry into the cathedral, a large banquet took place, during which the greats of the empire provided the court offices of the innkeeper, Truchsesses, chamberlain and marshal.

The following day the two sons of Friedrich, Henry and Frederick, personally received the accolade through him. The emperor's sons and many princes, who followed their example and did not want to be inferior to them in this respect, gave the knights and minstrels gifts in the form of horses, precious clothes, gold, and silver. This was followed by a riding event called gyrum, at which the knights showed their skills in swinging shields, banners and lances. Among the alleged 20,000 participants were the emperor and his sons. The next day the riding events continued. In the following week fighting games were to take place in Ingelheim. However, a storm caused several tents and the wooden church to collapse and also caused deaths among the celebrants. This was interpreted as a divine sign and the celebration was not continued.

== Actions ==
During the diet the emperor negotiated with Henry the Lion protected by archbishop Conrad about an anti-French alliance with England, which however remained unsuccessful. Another political event of far greater symbolic importance was the dispute over the rank of Abbot Konrad of Fulda. According to the chronicler Arnold of Lübeck, during a meeting of the princes he demanded it as his old right to sit to the left of the emperor at the time of court day. Only the Archbishop of Cologne had long contested the exercise of this right. The emperor then asked the archbishop of Cologne, Philipp of Heinsberg, who felt duped by the emperor's Lower Rhine territorial policy, to grant the wish of the abbot of Fulda. The archbishop had to regard this as an attack on his position, which found expression in the form of the seating arrangement. Philip then asked to leave the festivities and go to his inn, which was tantamount to refusing to consent to his ritual reduction of rank. This was followed by a scandal when numerous vassals of the Archbishop, including the Count Palatine near the Rhine, a brother of the Emperor, also requested their withdrawal from the festivities.

Thereupon, according to Arnold, the emperor's son Heinrich jumped up and fell to the archbishop with the words: "I beg you, dearest father, stay here and do not turn our joy into mourning" Philip was then allowed to take the place on the emperor's left, while the abbot of Fulda had to sit on one of the lower seats.

== Reception ==
The splendour of the Diet of Mainz was praised both in chronicles and in poetry. Thus Heinrich von Veldeke compared the court day in the Eneas novel with the marriage between Aeneas and Lavinia. The chronicler Arnold of Lübeck established a connection with the banquet of King Ahasuerus. Also the poet Guiot de Provins reported about the Mainz diet.

The research sees in the Mainz Court Day due to the size of the number of participants and the effort a sure indication that Barbarossa wanted to put an end to his largely failed Italian policy and at the same time make it forgotten by a demonstration of his ruling power.

== Bibliography ==
- Freed, John B. (2016). Frederick Barbarossa: The Prince and the Myth. New Haven, CT: Yale University Press. ISBN 978-0-300-122763.
