= Rainald of Urslingen =

Rainald of Urslingen was the son of Conrad of Urslingen and Duke of Spoleto from 1223 to 1230.

Rainald was initially appointed by the Papacy to oppose Dipold, Count of Acerra, and in 1228 he was granted sweeping powers, which he did not hesitate to use, as imperial vicar in the March of Ancona. In that year, he invaded the March and granted privileges to Osimo, San Ginesio, Ripatransone, and Recanati. This action sparked the War of the Keys.

== Sources ==
- Jordan, E. Les origines de la domination Angevine en Italie. Paris, 1909.

Italian nobility
Preceded by Dipold	Duke of Spoleto; 1223–1230	Succeeded by Conrad II
