= William of Capparone =

German noble

William of Capparone (fl. 1202–1206) was a German captain of Palermo who came to power as the regent of Sicily and guardian of future emperor Frederick II in 1202 after the death of Markward von Anweiler. He held the post for the next four years until 1206. He was called the Great Captain.

William was probably supported by Pisans, for he dates certain instruments of Fredericks with the Pisan system. He certainly did not have the support of the Hohenstaufen family, of which the young Frederick was a scion. He was opposed also by Pope Innocent III, who tried to arrange a favourable marriage for Frederick to put him under somebody else's influence.

William's dictatorship in Sicily is shown in that it is known that he expelled Urso, Bishop of Agrigento, from his diocese (for the second time) for refusal to take an oath of fealty.

In Spring 1204, the pope's legate began negotiating for peace and the recognition of the pope's representatives. Capparone never fulfilled his end of the deal, however, and peace was ultimately not obtained. In 1206, William was finally removed from power and replaced by the chancellor Walter of Palearia. William still held the royal palace, however. With the aid of Diepold, Count of Acerra, he was eventually dislodged, as were his Pisan friends. The Genoese gained ascendancy in Sicilian trade thereafter.

== Sources ==
- Gesta Innocentii III.
- Matthew, Donald (1992). The Norman Kingdom of Sicily. Cambridge University Press.
