= Terra di Lavoro =

Historical region of Southern Italy

Terra di Lavoro Liburia
- Coat of arms

- Map of the province of Terra di Lavoro during the Kingdom of the Two Sicilies
- Country: Kingdom of Sicily (1231-1282); Kingdom of Naples (1282-1816); Kingdom of the Two Sicilies (1816-1861); Kingdom of Italy (1861-1927)

Terra di Lavoro (Liburia in Latin) is the name of an historical region of Southern Italy. It corresponds roughly to the modern southern Lazio and northern Campania and upper north west and west border area of Molise regions of Italy.

In Italian the name means "Land of Work", but in fact derives from the ancient Liburia, a territory north of Aversa which took its name from the ancient Italic tribe of the Leborini.

With border changes over the centuries, it was a province of the Kingdom of Sicily and of the Kingdom of Naples, then of the Kingdom of the Two Sicilies and finally of the Kingdom of Italy. It was finally suppressed and divided among various provinces with the royal legislative decree n. 1 2 January 1927, during the fascist regime.

Ormai è vicina la Terra di Lavoro,
qualche branco di bufale, qualche
mucchio di case tra piante di pomidoro,

èdere e povere palanche.
Ogni tanto un fiumicello, a pelo
del terreno, appare tra le branche

degli olmi carichi di viti, nero
come uno scolo. Dentro, nel treno
che corre mezzo vuoto, il gelo

— Pier Paolo Pasolini, La terra di Lavoro, in Le ceneri di Gramsci, Garzanti 1957

== History ==
The Terra di Lavoro was originally a giustizierato (justiciarship) and then a province of the Kingdom of Sicily, later Kingdom of Naples. After the Congress of Vienna (1815) it became a department of the Kingdom of the Two Sicilies, and, after the unification of Italy (1860s), a province of the Regno d'Italia. The capital was Capua until 1818 and then Caserta.

In the pre-Republican Italy, the Terra di Lavoro was one of the largest provinces: it comprised the current province of Caserta, the southern part of today's provinces of Latina and Frosinone, the countryside of Nola of the province of Naples, and the Sannio (provinces of Benevento, Campobasso and Isernia).

The main cities in the province were Capua, Caserta, Sessa Aurunca, Formia, Gaeta, Isola del Liri, Itri, Nola, Acerra, Sora, Aquino, Arpino and Roccasecca. The Pontine Islands were also part of the province.

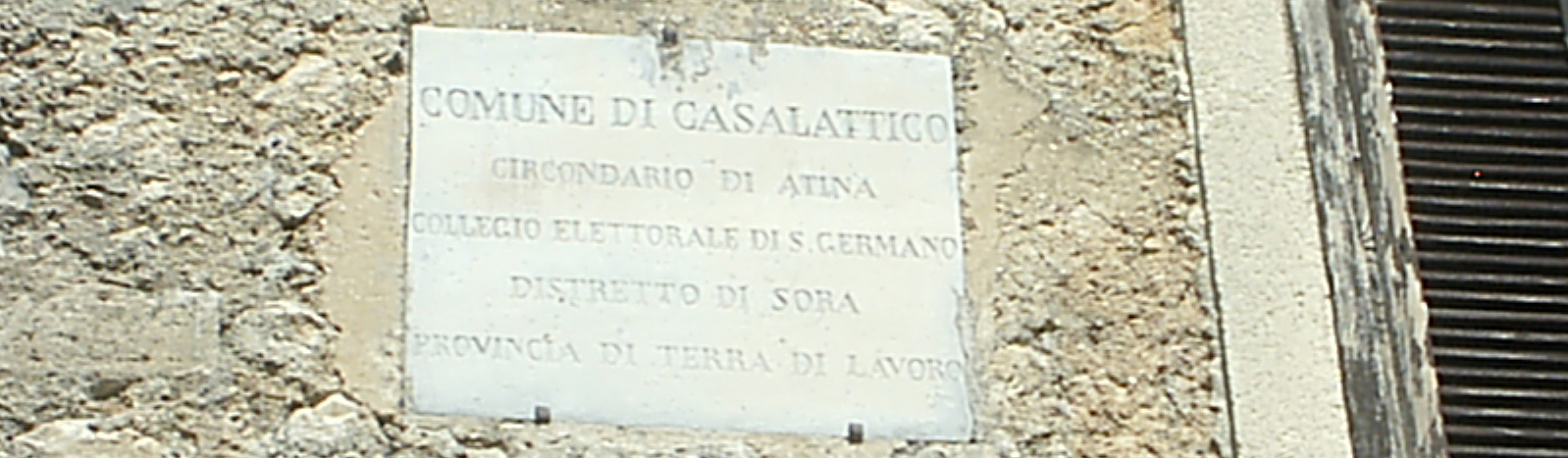
Terra di Lavoro in an old city plate of Casalattico

In 1863 the upper valley of the Volturno was separated to form the new province of Campobasso, while the comunes in the Valle Caudina became part of the provinces of Benevento and Avellino. In 1927 the province of Frosinone was established and the Terra di Lavoro was abolished, probably by personal order by Benito Mussolini. Its comunes were annexed to the province of Rome, Naples, Benevento, Campobasso and, after 1934, to the province of Littoria (modern Latina).

In 1945 the new province of Caserta was created, including comunes of the central Terra di Lavoro (including Aversa) previously part of the province of Naples, Benevento and Campobasso.

== Atlas ==
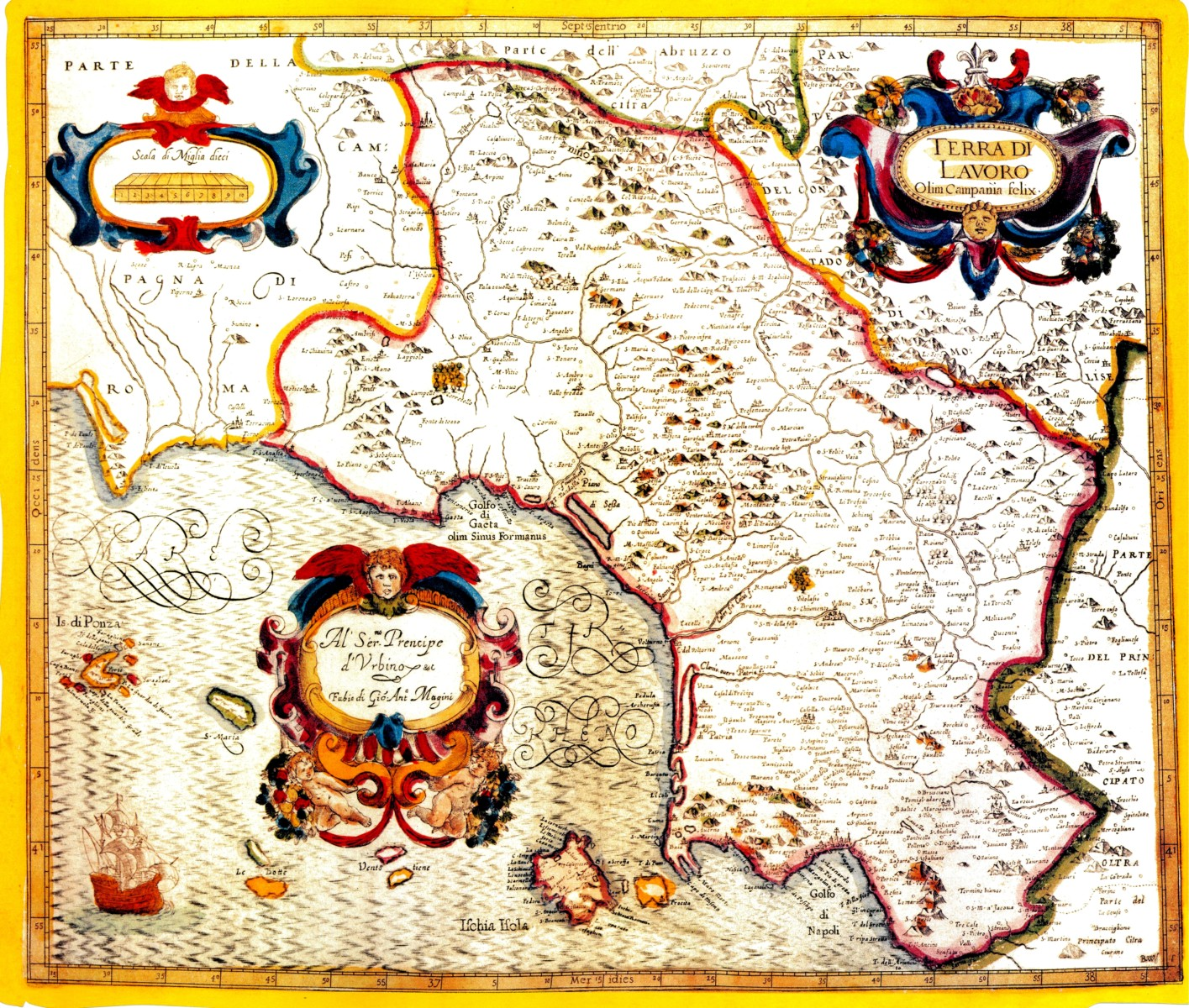
Terra di Lavoro

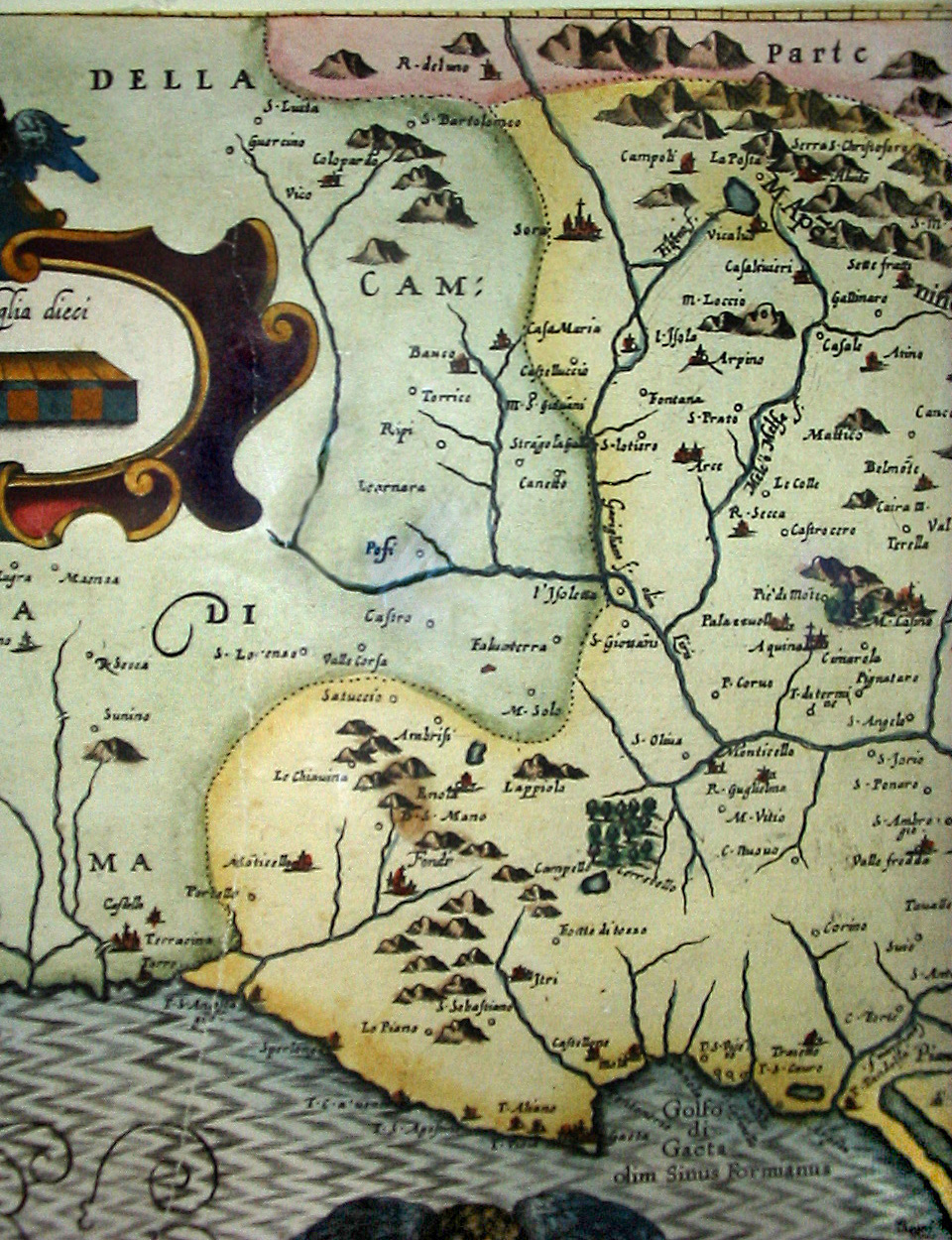
Gaeta and Sora districts

== Notable people ==
- Luigi Torro (1836–1900), painter

== See also ==
- Kingdom of Two Sicilies
- Kingdom of Naples
- Province of Frosinone
- Province of Caserta
- Province of Latina
