= Conrad I of Spoleto =

12th-century Duke of Spoleto

Conrad of Urslingen (died 1202) was the Duke of Spoleto on two occasions: first from 1183 to 1190 and then from 1195 to 1198.

== Early life ==
Conrad began his career as count of Assisi, which was given him after its 1174 conquest by Christian of Mainz. Frederick Barbarossa, the emperor, invested Conrad as count and granted him the Rocca as his seat of power. During his countship, Saint Francis was born at Assisi.

== Rule in Spoleto ==
In 1183, Frederick appointed him duke of Spoleto. In 1190, he was chased from Spoleto by the ascendant Guelph powers, but he regained his duchy in 1195. He briefly sheltered the young Emperor Frederick II at the Rocca and acted as the vicar of the Kingdom of Sicily, but in 1198 he was ordered to render Spoleto to the Pope and during his absence, Assisi rebelled and declared a commune.

== Family ==
His son was Rainald of Urslingen, Duke of Spoleto from 1223 to 1230.

== Historical significance ==
The military imperial career of Conrad I is significantly coterminous with the incipient and aggressive assertion of power by the "communes" of Italy (and European lands generally) and his chaotic biography as an imperial representative, symbolic of the decline of trans-national imperium within Italy and Europe overall, communes self-appointing "militias" across Christendom to overthrow the loyal local upholders of the idea of the Sacrum Imperium - thus paving the way for modern nationalism indirectly.

== General references ==
- Jordan, E. Les origines de la domination Angevine en Italie. Paris, 1909.

Italian nobility
| Preceded by Ridelulf | Duke of Spoleto; 1183–1190 | Succeeded by Pandulf II |
| Preceded by Pandulf II | Duke of Spoleto; 1195–1198 | Vacant Part of Papal States Title next held by Henry |
