= Richard of San Germano =

Richard of San Germano (Italian: Riccardo; before 1170 – after October 1243) was a notary in San Germano in the Latin Valley not far from the monastery of Monte Cassino between February 1186 and March 1232. He wrote a chronicle (sometimes Chronica regni Siciliae) of the Mezzogiorno from the death of William II of Sicily in 1189 to 1243. It is the fullest source of information on the Hohenstaufen in Italy.

Richard was a companion of Stephen of Marsia, the abbot of Montecassino, and dedicated his chronicle to him. His brother John was also a notary, though in the chancery of Emperor Frederick II. In the early 1220s, Richard was found in the service of Frederick, perhaps alongside his brother. In the late 1230s, Richard became an imperial Chamberlain (until 1242).

His chronicle was originally intended as a continuation of the Annales Casinenses. It is largely, but far from mostly, focused on the Terra Sancti Benedicti, the lands of the abbey of Montecassino. The first part was written beginning in 1216 and covers the time between the papal visit to San Germano and the death of Stephen of Marsia in July 1227. This survives in manuscript form in Bologna. Altered and expanded to stand on its own, the chronicle was finished after the Roman visit of Pope Innocent IV in October 1243. It then began with the conquest of Sicily by Henry VI. It is an important source for the War of the Keys (1228–1230).

Richard was personally involved in many of the events he recounts. Pope Innocent III visited his monastery in June 1208. He accompanied Stephen of Marsia to the Fourth Lateran Council in 1215. He was at the siege of Milan in 1239.

== Sources ==
- Ryccardi di Sancto Germano Notarii Chronicon, ed. C. A. Garufi in Rerum Italicarum Scriptores, 2nd edition. Bologna: 1938.
- The Chronicle of Richard of San Germano for 1189–1199, translated by G. A. Loud. Leeds: 2002.
