= Liber ad honorem Augusti =

1196 epic poem by Peter of Eboli

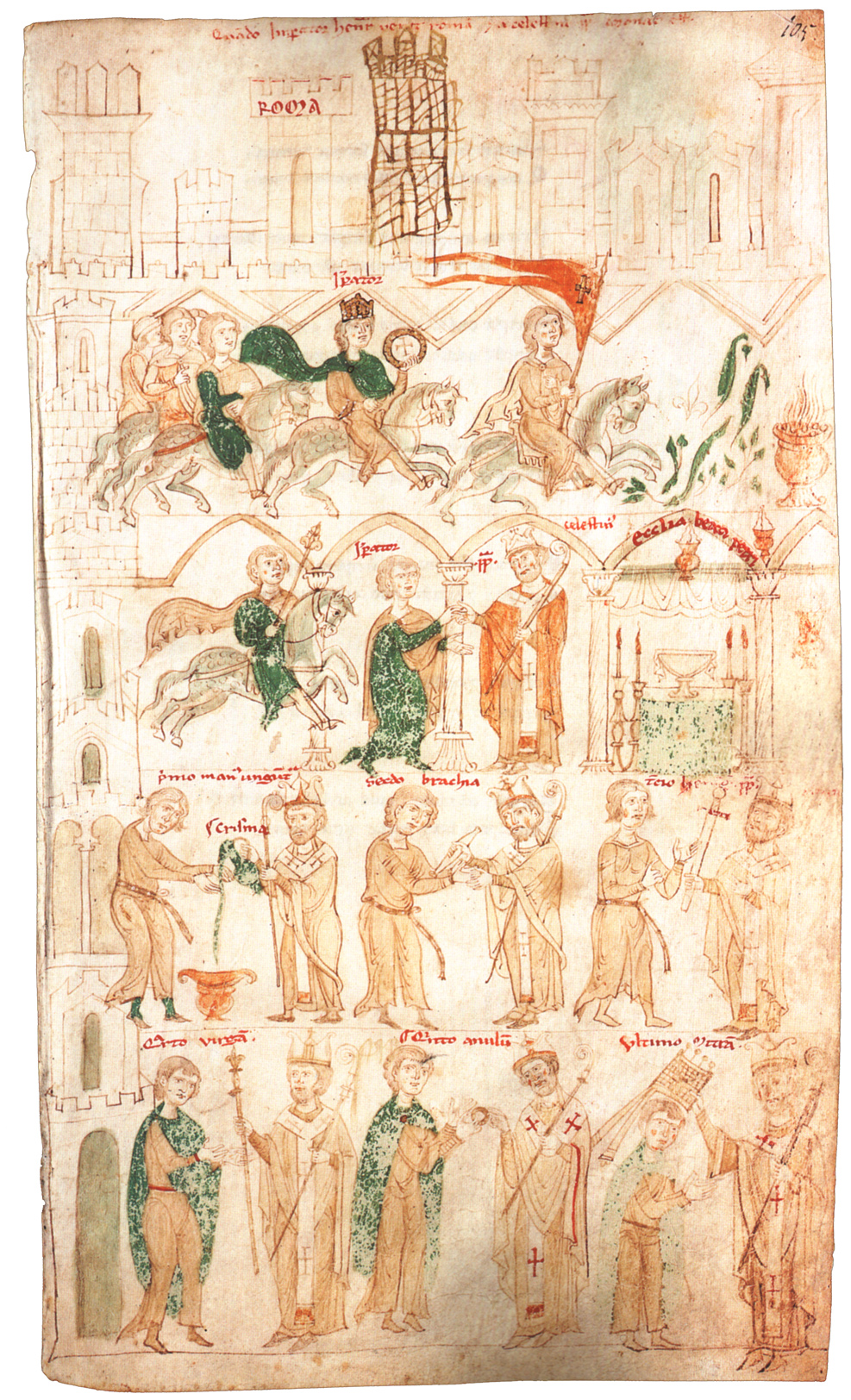
The enthronement of emperor Henry VI, an illumination from the Liber ad honorem Augusti, 1197

The Liber ad honorem Augusti sive de rebus Siculis ("Book in honour of the Augustus, or on Sicilian affairs"; also called Carmen de motibus Siculis, "Poem on the Sicilian revolt") is an illustrated narrative epic in Latin elegiac couplets, written in Palermo in 1196 by Peter of Eboli (in Latin, Petrus de Ebulo). The presentation copy, ordered by chancellor Conrad of Querfurt, is now MS. 120 II of the Bern Municipal Library.

It tells the story of Tancred of Lecce's attempt to take control of Sicily, an attempt thwarted by the successful military campaign of Henry VI, Holy Roman Emperor. Composed in honour of Henry VI and intended for presentation to him, the poem, distributed into three books, the last one being an encomium of Henry VI, and 52 continuously numbered particulae, is written in a mannered and sophisticated style. It is often mocking and extremely biased (see for example part. 4; 7-9; 25f. and the illustrations), but, once allowance has been made for this, is a useful and detailed historical source. It contains much information about Constance of Sicily, the wife of Henry VI (part. 20ff.), and the birth of her son Frederick II, Holy Roman Emperor (part. 43).

Each page opening pairs a column of Latin text with a full-page illustration and brief captions. The volume provides a vivid depiction of 12th-century life in Italy and Sicily and can be usefully compared with the 11th-century Bayeux Tapestry. Its striking caricatures of Tancred, portrayed with exaggerated, almost ape-like features, also reflect the text’s strongly propagandistic perspective.

== Bibliography ==
- Theo Kölzer, Marlis Stähli, Petrus de Ebulo: Liber ad honorem Augusti sive de rebus Siculis, text revised, translated and annotated by Gereon-Becht-Jördens, Jan Thorbecke Verlag, 1994 ISBN 3-7995-4245-0 [Complete facsimile with German translation and commentary]
- Petrus de Ebulo, Book in Honor of Augustus (Liber ad honorem Augusti), trans. Gwenyth Hood, Medieval & Renaissance Texts & Studies v.398 (Tempe, AZ: Arizona Center for Medieval and Renaissance Studies, 2012), 560pp. ISBN 978-0866984461 [English translation]
