= Peter of Eboli =

Italian poet and historian

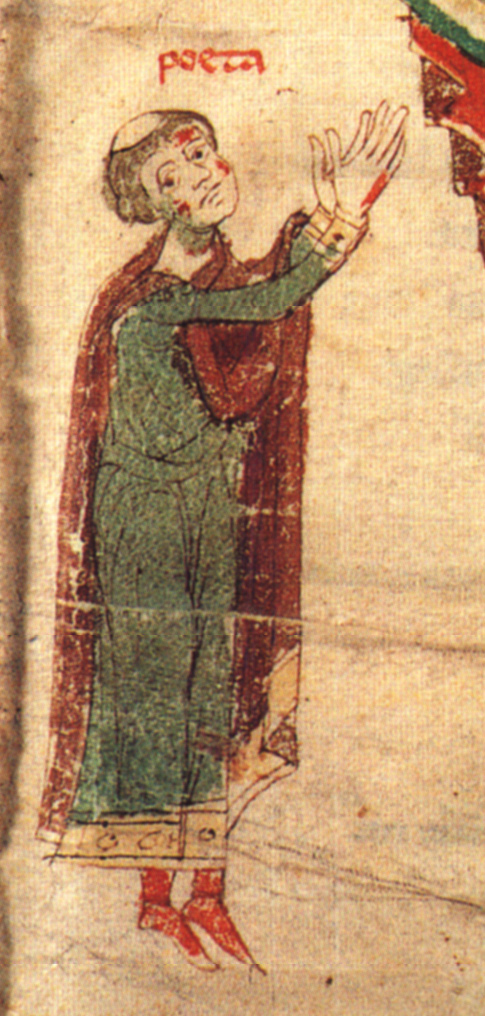
Self-portrait in Liber ad honorem Augusti, 1196.

Peter of Eboli or Petrus de Ebulo (flourished c. 1196–1220) was a didactic versifier and chronicler who wrote in Latin.

A monk from Eboli (Campania, then part of the Kingdom of Sicily), Peter became a court poet to Henry VI, Holy Roman Emperor and King of Sicily. His flattering verse Liber ad honorem Augusti, sive de rebus Siculis (Book to honor the Emperor, or The Affairs of Sicily), probably written in Palermo, was his first work; it was dedicated to Henry VI, King of Sicily by right of his wife Constance, the Norman heiress and mother of the heir who would be "in every way blessed" according to Peter—Frederick II, stupor mundi— whose birth is described in terms reshaped from Virgil's fourth Eclogue, which Christians read as foretelling the coming of Christ. The book celebrates in glowing terms the victory of Henry over his opponent, the illegitimate usurper Tancred, who, though a doughty fighter, was of such short stature that Peter ridicules him as Tancredulus ("Little Tancred"). The copy from Palermo is illuminated with palace scenes, processions, and battles in tableaux that vie with the text itself and form a precious record of twelfth-century life, as those of the Bayeux Tapestry do for the eleventh.

Peter of Eboli also wrote a didactic poem, De balneis Puteolanis ("The Baths of Pozzuoli") that is the first widely distributed guidebook to thermal baths, a weapon in the local economic rivalries that arose over healing, medicinal bathing and the medieval tourist industry in southern Italy during the High Middle Ages. A copy is included in the historical miscellany at the Huntington Library, HM 1342.

Peter is known to have written three poems because he lists them all at the end of De balneis Puteolanis in the following elegiac couplets:

Suscipe, sol mundī, tibi quem praesentŏ libellum:
dē tribus ad dominum tertius iste venit.
Prīmus habet patriōs cīvīlī marte triumphōs;
mīra Fedērīcī gesta secundus habet;
tam loca quam vīrēs quam nōmina pēne sepulta
tertius Euboÿcīs iste reformat aquīs.

Translation:

Sun of the World, pick up this little book I offer you:
This is the third of the three to reach my Lord.
The first contains our national victories in civil war;
The second contains the remarkable deeds of Frederick;
This third sets in order the waters of the Euboean colony,
Their locations, their powers and their almost buried names.

The second poem of the three listed here, the mira Federici gesta ("remarkable deeds of Frederick") is lost.
