= Italo-Normans =

Ethnic group of southern Italy

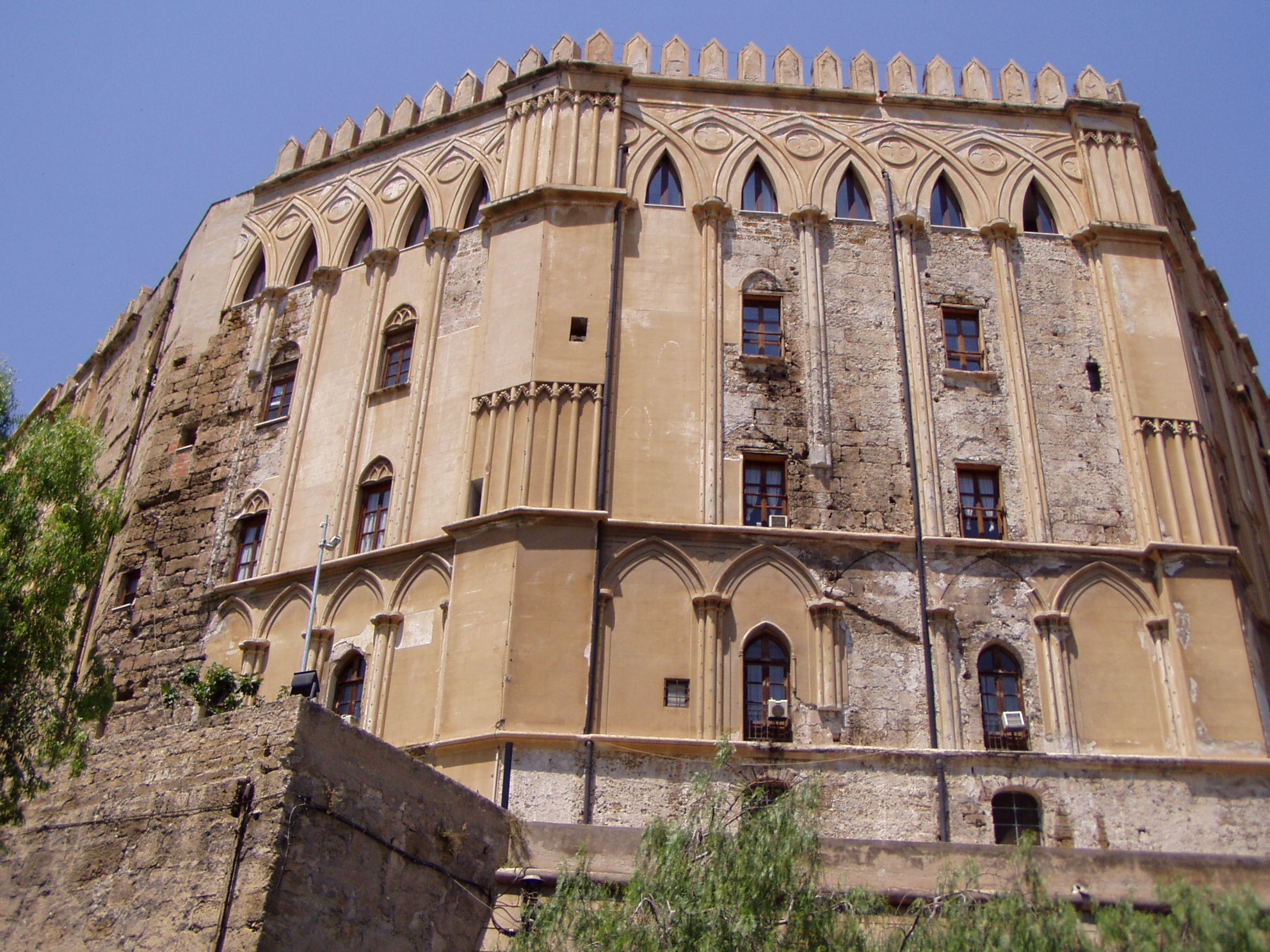
Palazzo dei Normanni, the palace of the Norman kings in Palermo.

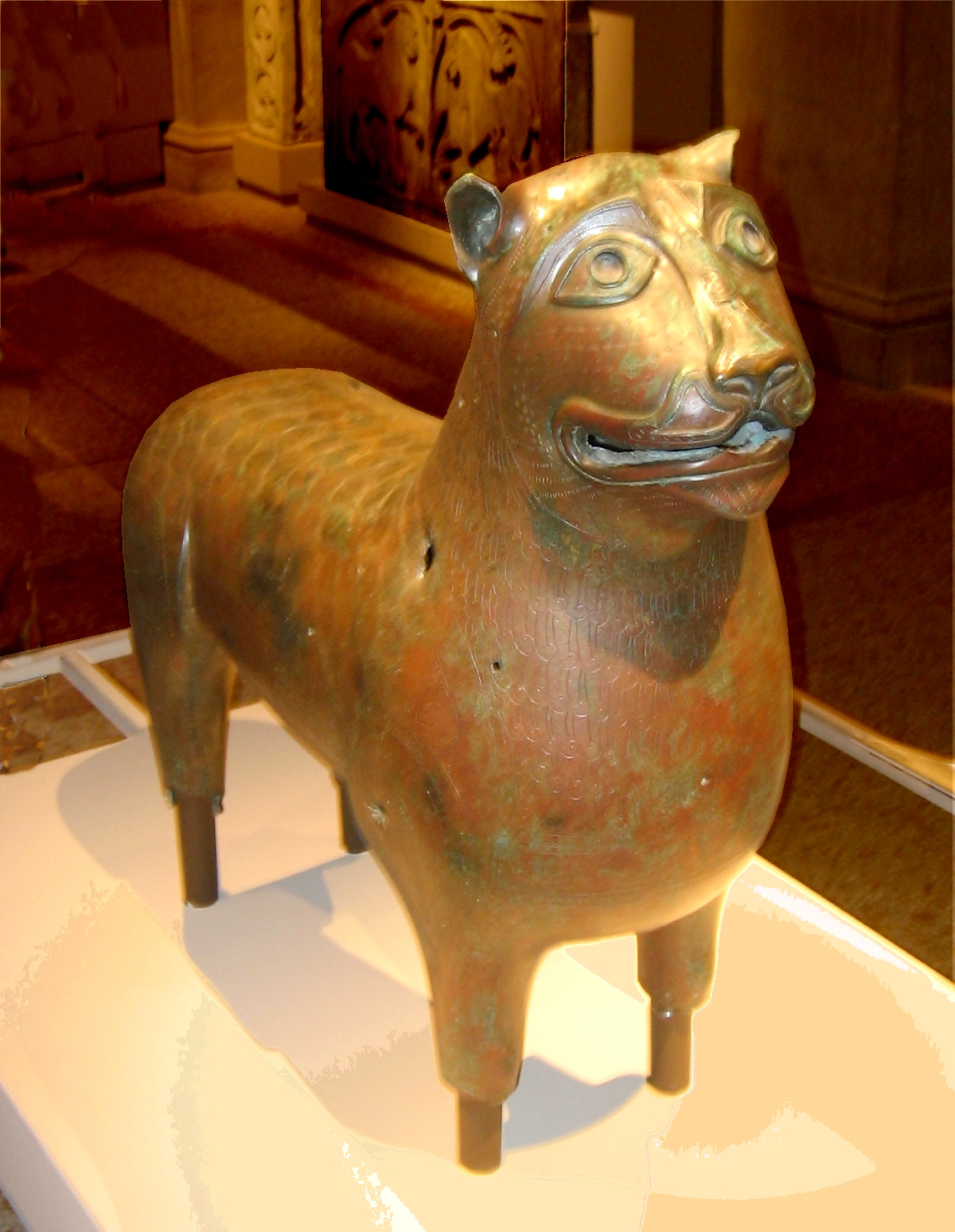
Bronze lion attributed to an Italo-Norman artist (Metropolitan Museum of Art).

The Italo-Normans (Italian: Italo-Normanni), or Siculo-Normans (Siculo-Normanni) when referring to Sicily and Southern Italy, are the Italian-born descendants of the first Norman conquerors to travel to Southern Italy in the first half of the eleventh century. While maintaining much of their distinctly Norman culture and customs of war, French culture also played an important role, they were partly shaped by the diversity of Southern Italy, by the cultures and customs of the Greeks, Lombards, and Arabs in Sicily.

== History ==
Normans first arrived in Italy as pilgrims, probably on their way to or returning from either Rome or Jerusalem, or from visiting the shrine at Monte Gargano, during the late tenth and early eleventh centuries. In 1017, the Lombard lords in Apulia recruited their assistance against the dwindling power of the Byzantine Catepanate of Italy. They soon established vassal states of their own and began to expand their conquests until they were encroaching on the Lombard principalities of Benevento and Capua, Saracen-controlled territories, as well as Greek, and territory under papal allegiance. Their conquest of Sicily, which began in 1061, was completed by 1091.

Italo-Normans were the primary Norman mercenaries in the employ of the Byzantine emperors, and many found service in Rome under the pope. Some went to Spain to join the Reconquista, and in 1096 the Normans of Bohemond of Taranto joined the First Crusade and set up the principality of Antioch in the Levant.

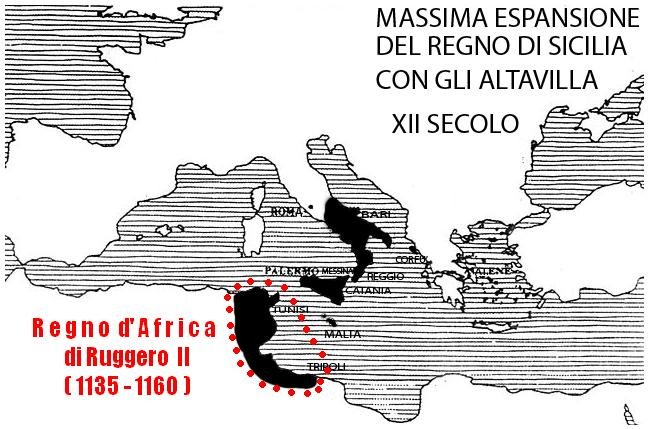
The "Kingdom of Africa" (Regno d'Africa) of Italo-Norman Roger II, pinpointed in red

In 1130 under Roger II, they created the Kingdom of Sicily, encompassing the whole of their conquests on the peninsula and the island. Between 1135 and 1155 Roger II also created an Italo-Norman Kingdom of Africa in coastal Tunisia and Tripolitania. He intended to unite this African kingdom with his Kingdom of Sicily, but his untimely death in 1154 put an end to these plans.

When founded in 1130, this Italo-Norman kingdom united the whole of Southern Italy under the same rule for the first time since Justinian's brief reconquest of the peninsula as a whole. The Norman dynasty established by Roger II continued with William I, and then William II. After the latter's death without heirs in 1189, and following the brief reign of his illegitimate cousin Tancred of Lecce, the German Emperor Henry VI of Swabia (who had married Constance, aunt and legitimate successor of William II) conquered the kingdom in 1194, defeating William III of Sicily (son of Tancred) and ending the Italo-Norman dynasty.

== Italo-Norman families ==
- Hauteville family
- Drengot family
- Filangieri family
- Paulo family Baroni di Sessa
- Sanseverino family

== See also ==
- Norman conquest of southern Italy
- Byzantine–Norman wars
- Norman–Arab–Byzantine culture
- Normans in France
- Anglo-Norman, the Normans in England
- Cambro-Norman, the Normans in Wales
- Hiberno-Norman, the Normans in Ireland
- Scoto-Norman, the Normans in Scotland
