= List of Sicilian royal consorts =

This is a list of consorts of the Kingdom of Sicily. Many Kings of Sicily had more than one wife; they may have divorced their wife or she might have died.

== Countesses of Sicily ==
=== House of Hauteville, 1130–1198 ===
Picture	Name	Father	Birth	Marriage	Became Countess	Ceased to be Countess	Death	Spouse
	Judith d'Évreux	William, Count of Évreux (Normandy)	c. 1050	c. 1061	January 1072 husband's ascension	c. 1076		Roger I
	Eremburga of Mortain	William, Count of Mortain	?	c. 1077		c. 1087		Roger I
	Adelaide del Vasto	Mafred I del Vasto (Aleramici del Vasto)	c. 1075	c. 1089		22 June 1101 husband's death	16 April 1118	Roger I
	Elvira of Castile	Alfonso VI of Castile (Jiménez)	c. 1100	c. 1117	28 September 1105 husband's ascension	27 September 1130 became queen	8 February 1135	Roger II

== Queens consort of Sicily ==
=== House of Hauteville, 1130–1198 ===
Picture	Name	Father	Birth	Marriage	Became Queen	Ceased to be Queen	Death	Spouse
	Elvira of Castile	Alfonso VI of Castile (Jiménez)	1100	1117	1130 husband's accession	8 February 1135		Roger II
	Sibylla of Burgundy	Hugh II, Duke of Burgundy (Burgundy)	1126	1149		16 September 1150		Roger II
	Beatrice of Rethel	Ithier, Count of Rethel (2nd Rethel)	1131	1151		26 February 1154 husband's death	30 March 1185	Roger II
	Margaret of Navarre	García Ramírez of Navarre (Jiménez)	1128	1150	26 February 1154 husband's ascension	7 May 1166 husband's death	12 August 1183	William I
	Joan of England	Henry II of England (Plantagenet)	October 1165	13 February 1177		11 November 1189 husband's death	4 September 1199	William II
	Sibylla of Acerra	Roger, Count of Acerra (d'Aquino)	1153	-	1189 husband's ascension	20 February 1194 husband's death	1205	Tancred I
	Irene Angelina	Isaac II Angelos (Angeloi)	1177/81	July/August 1192		24 December 1193 husband's death	27 August 1208	Roger III

=== House of Hohenstaufen, 1194–1266 ===
Picture	Name	Father	Birth	Marriage	Became Queen	Ceased to be Queen	Death	Spouse
	Constance of Aragon	Alfonso II of Aragon (Barcelona)	c. 1179	15 August 1209		23 June 1222		Frederick II
	Isabella II of Jerusalem	John of Brienne (Brienne)	c. 1212	9 November 1225		25 April 1228		Frederick II
	Isabella of England	John of England (Plantagenet)	c. 1214	15 July 1235		1 December 1241		Frederick II
	Elisabeth of Bavaria	Otto II Wittelsbach, Duke of Bavaria (Wittelsbach)	c. 1227	1 September 1246	13 December 1250 husband's ascension	21 May 1254 husband's death	9 October 1273	Conrad I
	Helena Angelina Doukaina	Michael II Komnenos Doukas (Komnenodoukas)	c. 1242	9 November 1255	10 August 1258 husband's ascension	26 February 1266 husband's death	14 March 1271	Manfred

=== Capetian House of Anjou, 1266–1282 ===
Picture	Name	Father	Birth	Marriage	Became Queen	Ceased to be Queen	Death	Spouse
	Beatrice of Provence	Raymond Berenguer IV of Provence (Barcelona)	c.1234	31 January 1246	26 February 1266 husband's ascension	23 September 1267		Charles I
	Margaret of Burgundy	Eudes of Burgundy, Count of Nevers and Auxerre (Burgundy)	c. 1250	18 November 1268		4 September 1282; Sicily passed to Aragon	4 September 1308	Charles I

=== House of Barcelona, 1282–1410 ===
Picture	Name	Father	Birth	Marriage	Became Queen	Ceased to be Queen	Death	Spouse
	Isabella of Castile	Sancho IV of Castile (Anscarids)	1283	1 December 1291		25 April 1295 marriage annulled	24 July 1328	James I
	Blanche of Anjou	Charles II of Naples (Anjou-Sicily)	1280	29 October/1 November 1295		11 December 1295 husband's deposition	14 October 1310	James I
	Eleanor of Anjou	Charles II of Naples (Anjou)	August 1289	17 May 1302		25 June 1337 husband's death	9 August 1341	Frederick III
	Elisabeth of Carinthia	Otto III of Carinthia (Gorizia-Tyrol)	c. 1298	23 April 1322	25 June 1337 husband's ascension	15 August 1342 husband's death	after 1347	Peter II
	Constance of Aragon	Peter IV of Aragon (Barcelona)	c. 1343	11 April 1361		18 July 1363		Frederick the Simple
	Antonia of Baux	Francis of Baux, Duke of Andria (Baux)	c. 1353	26 November 1373		23 January 1375		Frederick the Simple
	Blanche I of Navarre	Charles III of Navarre (Evreux)	6 July 1387	26 December 1402		25 July 1409 husband's's death	1 April 1441	Martin I
	Margarida of Prades	Pedro of Aragon, Baron of Entenza (Barcelona)	1395	17 September 1409		31 May 1410 husband's death	1422	Martin II

=== House of Trastamara, 1412–1516 ===
Picture	Name	Father	Birth	Marriage	Became Queen	Ceased to be Queen	Death	Spouse
	Eleanor of Alburquerque	Sancho Alfonso, 1st Count of Alburquerque (Trastamara)	c. 1374	1393/4	28 June 1412 husband's ascension	2 April 1416 husband's death	c. 1435	Ferdinand I
	Maria of Castile	Henry III of Castile (Trastamara)	1 September 1401	12 June 1415	2 April 1416 husband's accession	4 October 1458		Alfonso
	Juana Enríquez	Fadrique Enríquez, Count of Melba and Rueda (Enríquez)	1425	1 April 1444	4 October 1458 husband's ascension	13 February 1468		John
	Isabella I of Castile	John II of Castile (Trastámara)	22 April 1451	19 October 1469		26 November 1504		Ferdinand II
	Germaine of Foix	John of Foix, Viscount of Narbonne (Foix-Grailly)	c. 1488	19 October 1505		23 January 1516 husband's death	18 October 1538	Ferdinand II

=== Consorts of Claimants against John II, 1462–1472 ===
During the War against John II, there were three who claimed his throne, though this never included the Kingdom of Valencia. One of the three was Peter V of Aragon who remained a bachelor. The others Henry IV of Castile and René of Anjou had wives during their reign as pretenders. The wives of Henry IV were Joan of Portugal, a Portuguese infanta daughter of King Edward of Portugal and his wife Eleanor of Aragon. The first wife of Rene died prior to 1462; his second wife was Jeanne de Laval, a French noblewoman and daughter Guy XIV de Laval, Count of Laval and Isabella of Brittany.

=== House of Habsburg, 1516–1700 ===
Picture	Name	Father	Birth	Marriage	Became Queen	Ceased to be Queen	Death	Spouse
	Isabella of Portugal	Manuel I of Portugal (Aviz)	24 October 1503	11 March 1526		1 May 1539		Charles II
	Mary I of England	Henry VIII of England (Tudor)	18 February 1516	25 July 1554	16 January 1556 husband's ascension	17 November 1558		Philip I
	Elisabeth of Valois	Henry II of France (Valois)	2 April 1545	22 June 1559		3 October 1568		Philip I
	Anna of Austria	Maximilian II, Holy Roman Emperor (Habsburg)	1 November 1549	4 May 1570		26 October 1580		Philip I
	Margaret of Austria	Charles II of Austria (Habsburg)	25 December 1584	18 April 1599		3 October 1611		Philip II
	Elisabeth of Bourbon	Henry IV of France (Bourbon)	22 November 1602	25 November 1615	31 March 1621 husband's ascension	6 October 1644		Philip III
	Mariana of Austria	Ferdinand III, Holy Roman Emperor (Habsburg)	24 December 1634	7 October 1649		17 September 1665 husband's death	16 May 1696	Philip III
	Marie Louise of Orléans	Philippe I, Duke of Orléans (Orléans)	26 March 1662	19 November 1679		19 12 February 1689		Charles III
	Maria Anna of the Palatinate-Neuburg	Philipp Wilhelm, Elector Palatine (Wittelsbach)	28 October 1667	14 May 1690		1 November 1700 husband's death	16 July 1740	Charles III

=== House of Bourbon, 1700–1713 ===
Picture	Name	Father	Birth	Marriage	Became Queen	Ceased to be Queen	Death	Spouse
	Maria Luisa of Savoy	Victor Amadeus II of Savoy (Savoy)	17 September 1688	2 November 1701		11 April 1713; Sicily ceded to Savoy	14 February 1714	Philip IV

=== House of Savoy, 1713–1720 ===
Picture	Name	Father	Birth	Marriage	Became Queen	Ceased to be Queen	Death	Spouse
	Anne Marie d'Orléans	Philippe I, Duke of Orléans (Orléans)	27 August 1669	10 April 1684	11 April 1713 husband's ascension	17 February 1720; Sicily ceded to Austria	26 August 1728	Victor Amadeus

=== House of Habsburg, 1720–1735 ===
Picture	Name	Father	Birth	Marriage	Became Queen	Ceased to be Queen	Death	Spouse
	Elisabeth Christine of Brunswick-Wolfenbüttel	Louis Rudolph, Duke of Brunswick-Lüneburg (Welf)	28 August 1691	1 August 1708	17 February 1720 husband's ascension	c. 1735; Sicily ceded to Spain	21 December 1750	Charles IV

=== House of Bourbon, 1735–1816 ===
Picture	Name	Father	Birth	Marriage	Became Queen	Ceased to be Queen	Death	Spouse
	Maria Amalia of Saxony	Augustus III of Poland (Wettin)	24 November 1724	19 June 1738		10 August 1759 husband's abdication, elevated to Queen of Spain	27 September 1760	Charles V
	Marie Caroline of Austria	Francis I, Holy Roman Emperor (Habsburg-Lorraine)	13 August 1752	12 May 1768		8 September 1814		Ferdinand III

== See also ==
- List of Sicilian monarchs
- List of royal consorts of the Kingdom of the Two Sicilies
- List of consorts of Naples
- List of Italian consorts
- List of Sardinian consorts
- List of Aragonese consorts
- List of Spanish consorts
