= William of Sicily =

William of Sicily may refer to:

- William I of Sicily, the second king of Sicily (1131-1166).
- William II of Sicily, the third king of Sicily (1155 - 1189).
- William III of Sicily, king of Sicily (1190–1198).
