= Roger of Sicily =

Roger of Sicily may refer to:

- Roger I of Sicily (c. 1031–1101), Norman nobleman
- Roger II of Sicily (1095–1154), King of Sicily 1130–1154
- Roger III of Sicily (1175–1193), King of Sicily 1192–1193
