= Elvira of Sicily =

Member of the Normon House of Hauteville

Elvira of Sicily (died in 1231) was a member of the House of Hauteville who claimed the throne of the Kingdom of Sicily. She is known by an exceptional number of names, including Albinia, Elvira, Maria, Albidina and Blanche.

== Early life ==
Elvira was the eldest daughter of Tancred, Count of Lecce, and Sibylla of Acerra. Her father, an illegitimate member of the royal family, seized the throne of Sicily upon the death of his cousin William II in 1189, thus dispossessing his aunt Constance, who had been heir presumptive as William II's closest legitimate relative. A war of succession ensued between Tancred and Constance's husband, Holy Roman Emperor Henry VI. King Tancred died in 1194, leaving the crown to his son, William III. William was deposed by Henry and Constance later that year. Elvira's defeated mother was promised the County of Lecce and the Principality of Taranto as compensation, but she and her children were soon arrested on the charges of treason. Elvira's brother died blinded in 1198, while she was taken with her mother and two sisters to Germany and imprisoned in Hohenburg Abbey. They either escaped or were set free following papal intervention.

== Pursuing claims ==
In 1199, Sibylla arrived in France with her daughters. Constance and Henry had both died shortly after conquering Sicily, leaving the kingdom to their infant son, Frederick. Sibylla intended for Elvira, her eldest surviving child, to marry a French nobleman powerful enough to press Elvira's claim on the Kingdom of Sicily against Frederick's regents. King Philip II of France convened a council in Melun, where it was decided that Elvira should marry Count Walter III of Brienne. Shortly after the marriage, Elvira, her husband and her mother all asked Pope Innocent III to help them take the kingdom. Walter petitioned him to recognize Elvira's claim to her father's throne. Innocent was Frederick's guardian, however, and refused to recognize Elvira as the heir of the entire kingdom. Instead, he recognized her right to the fiefs of Lecce and Taranto, her father's original domain, which had been promised to her mother by Henry. In exchange for this, Elvira and her family had to accept the infant Frederick as their king.

Elvira accompanied Walter to the Kingdom of Sicily in 1201. Her husband achieved significant victories against Frederick's forces but was ambushed and killed in 1205. Elvira was pregnant and some time afterwards gave birth to a posthumous son, Walter IV, who inherited Brienne. Although it had become accepted in northeastern France that a widow could rule as regent for her minor child, Elvira stayed with her son in southern Italy, effectively leaving the regency to his uncle John. Elvira's quick remarriage severed her link to the House of Brienne and John made no effort to support her claims.

== Later life ==
In order to protect her son's interests and advance her own claim to the throne, Elvira remarried soon after Walter's death. Her second husband was James, Count of Tricarico, whom she married already in 1205. She married, thirdly, Tegrimo di Modigliana, Count Palatine of Tuscia. Elvira died there in 1231.

== Bibliography ==
- McDougall, Sara (2016). Royal Bastards: The Birth of Illegitimacy, 800-1230. Oxford University Press. ISBN 978-0191088841.
- Perry, Guy (2013). John of Brienne: King of Jerusalem, Emperor of Constantinople, c.1175–1237. Cambridge University Press. ISBN 978-1107513204.
