= Nicholas of Ajello =

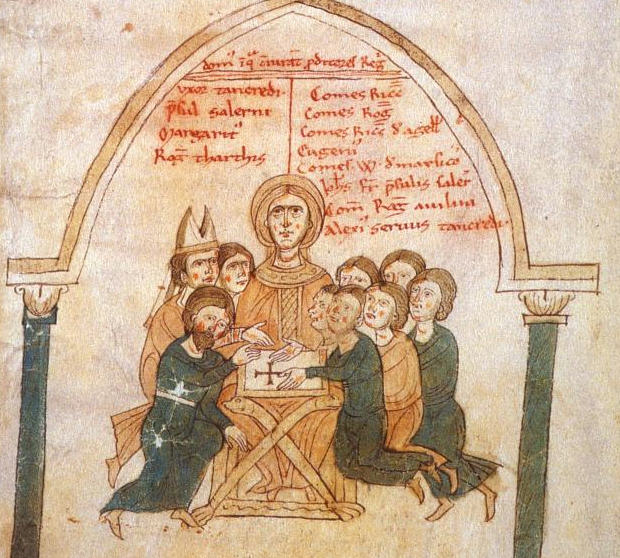
Illustration from the Liber ad honorem Augusti showing the conspirators of 1194. Nicholas is the bishop to Sibylla's right.

Nicholas of Ajello (Italian: Nicolò d'Aiello; died 10 February 1221) was the second son of the Sicilian chancellor Matthew of Ajello and the archbishop of Salerno from 1181, when he succeeded the historian Romuald Guarna. He was a trusted advisor in the Norman Kingdom of Sicily at the time of its fall to Henry VI, Holy Roman Emperor (1194).

Henry was helping his wife Constance I of Sicily press her claim to the Sicilian throne, which had been bequeathed to her by her late nephew William II, King of Sicily. When Henry was marching to besiege Naples in 1191, Salerno sent a letter promising him its loyalty and the Archbishop Nicholas, hostile to Germans, abandoned the faithless city for Naples, where he took control of the city's defences after Richard, Count of Acerra, was wounded. Together, he and the ammiratus ammiratorum Margaritus of Brindisi successfully defended the ancient city and forced Henry to lift the siege. When Henry retreated, he left Constance at Salerno as a sign that he would soon return. Nicholas wrote letters to tell the events to his friends in Salerno, and the populace of Salerno resubmitted to King Tancred and besieged Constance. Constance spoke to them trying to explain that the defeat of Henry was exaggerated by Nicholas, but the Salernitani were determined to capture her in favor of Tancred; finally they handed her to Tancred.

Though it was of little effect in the long term. The empress was released the next year; Henry was crowned on 25 December 1194 in Palermo, with not only Nicholas, but Richard, Margaritus, and Queen Sibylla present. Four days later, they were all arrested on charges of conspiracy (probably trumped up) and shipped off to German prisons. There he remained for many years, despite the prayers and pleas of Pope Innocent III.
