= La Magione, Palermo =

Roman Catholic church in Italy

Basilica of the Most Holy Trinity or La Magione
- Basilica della Santissima Trinità (in Italian)
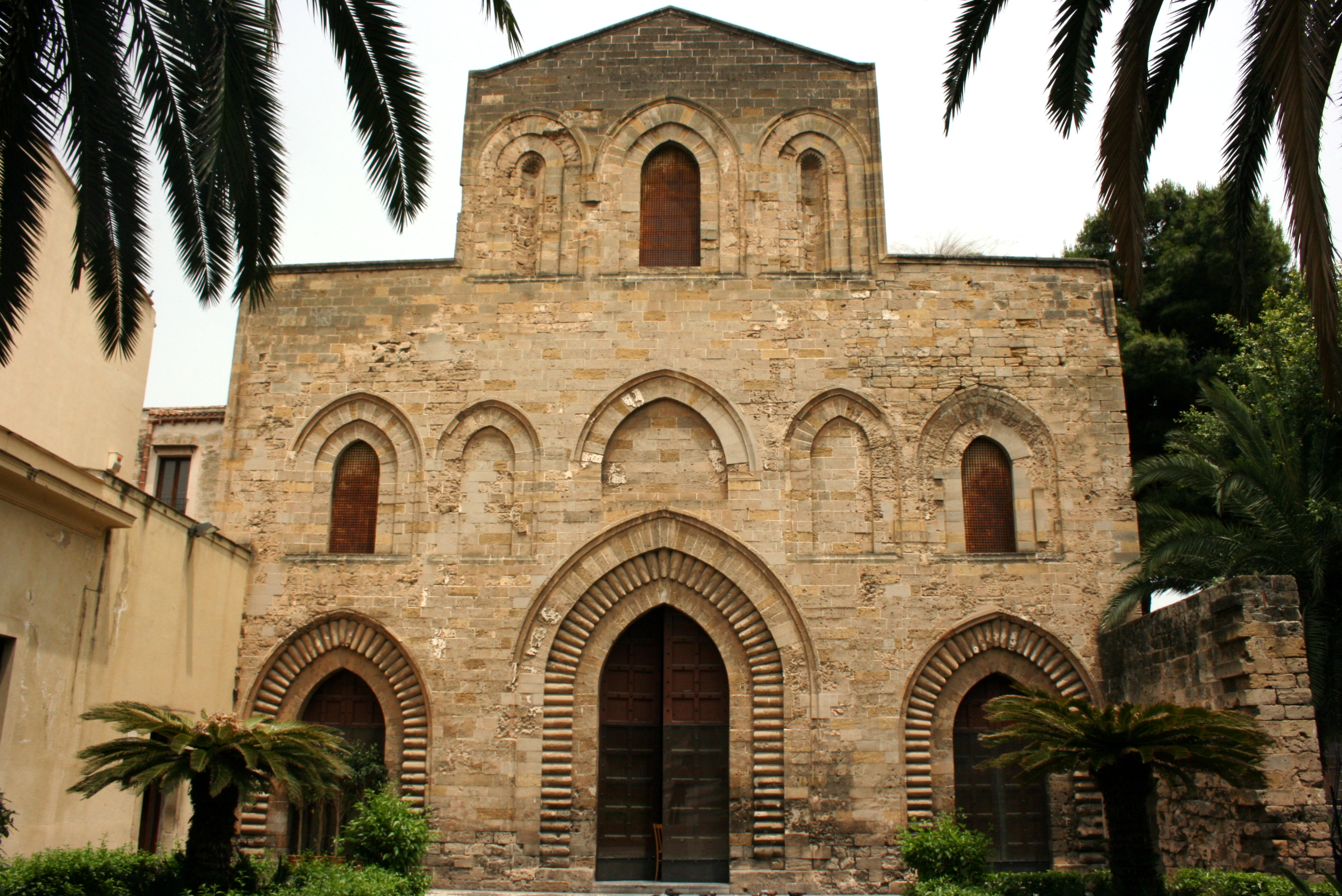
- Façade of the Basilica

Religion
- Affiliation: Roman Catholic
- Province: Archdiocese of Palermo
- Rite: Roman Rite

Location
- Location: Palermo, Italy
- Interactive map of Basilica of the Most Holy Trinity or La Magione
- Coordinates: 38°06′49″N 13°22′08″E

Architecture
- Style: Arab-Norman
- Completed: 1191

Website
- Official site

La Magione is a 12th-century Norman-Gothic architecture, Roman Catholic Basilica church, located on Via Magione #44. The entrance to the facade, which faces southeast, is through a garden path midway between via Castrofilippo (the southern edge of Piazza Maggione) and Via Giuseppe Garibaldi, in the ancient quarter of Kalsa of Palermo, region of Sicily, Italy. The apse of the church is on the southeast corner of Piazza Magione.

== History ==
A church at the site was completed by 1191, perhaps at the site of a former mosque, and is the last church built in the capital of the Norman Kingdom of Sicily during the period of the Hauteville dynasty. Its foundation is linked to the Chancellor of the Kingdom, Matthew of Ajello, who initially assigned the church and an adjacent monastery to the Cistercian order. However when Palermo fell by the 1190s under the rule of the Hohenstaufen Henry VI, Holy Roman Emperor, the Cistercian monks, who had favored Henry's rival Tancred, were expelled, and the property granted in 1197 to the Teutonic Order. Both Tancred and his son, prince Roger III of Sicily, were buried in this church in 1193-1194.

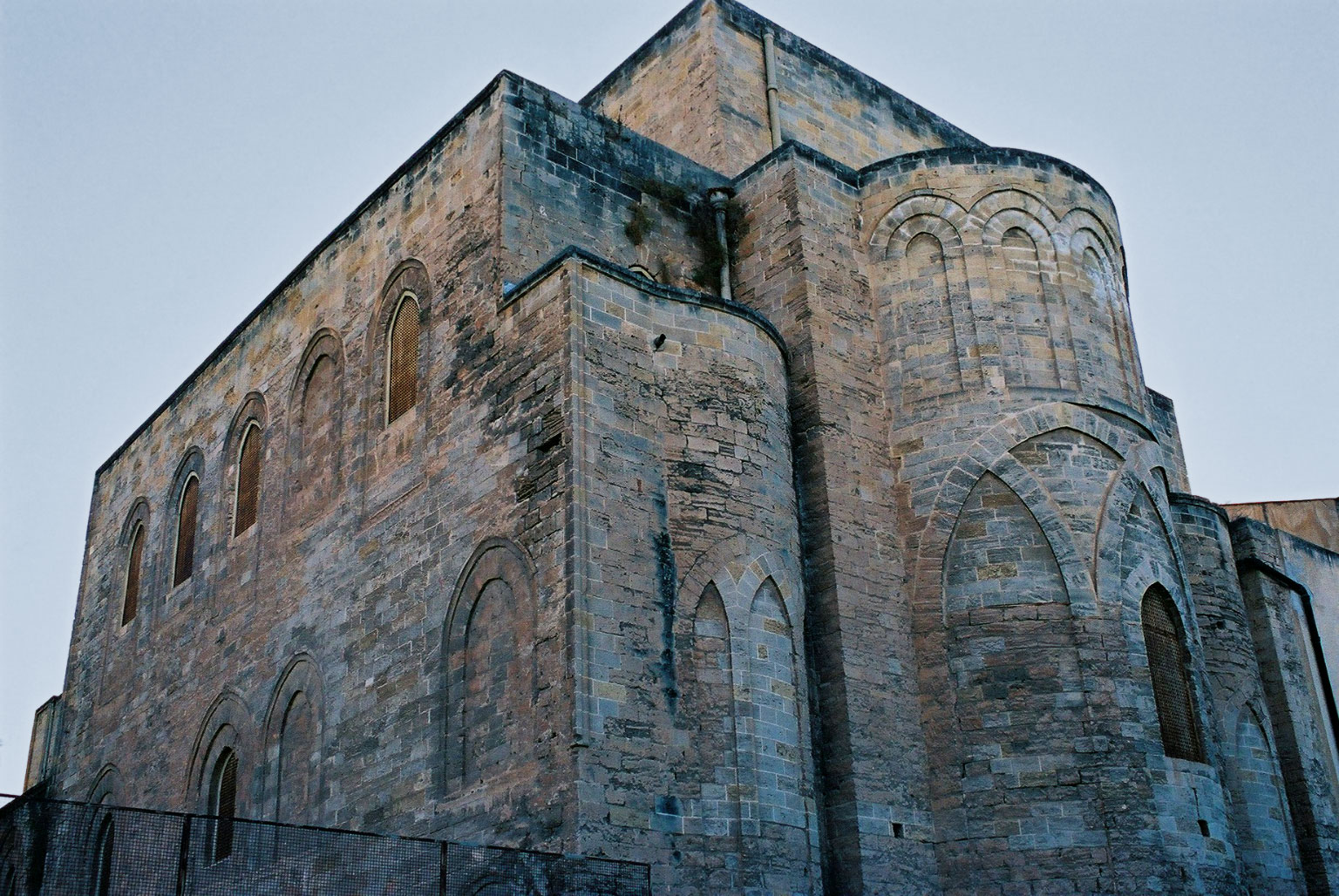
Side view and apse

The Teutonic Knights served as protectors of the young King Frederick II for over a decade during his minority. The knights built dormitories, an armory and stables. The name Magione is thought to derive from a word derived from the Latin term Mansio, often referring to the house of a lord (mansion), and to the residences of the Teutonic knights.

In 1492, at the request of Pope Innocent VIII, King Ferdinand II of Aragon, removed the Teutonic Order from Sicily. The complex became a residence for priests and abbots under the administration of the archbishop of Palermo. In 1780 it passed unto direct control of the Bourbon of Naples and in 1787 it was given to the Sacred Military Constantinian Order of Saint George. They were expelled in the 1860s during the suppression of religious orders by the Kingdome of Italy.

In 19th century an important restoration was realized by Giuseppe Patricolo, stripping away some of the additions to the Norman church. A description from 1875 describes the building as sadly disfigured. The church suffered from the bombing of the second world war and someone part was rebuilt in the restoration. The church has the title of Minor basilica.

== Description ==
The access to the church complex is through a baroque gateway, first installed in the 18th-century with two flanking protruding columns upon which stand the allegorical representations of Faith and Charity. In the center, above the portal is the coat of arms of the Constantinian Order. This leads to a garden path with cycads and bougainvillea.

The present façade is the result of many alterations; those from the late 19th and early 20th-century stripped the baroque portal to the church, and the neoclassical portico that had been added previously. What remains is a brick façade accentuated by a number of ogival arches, including the portal and some flanking windows.

The church interior has a Latin cross layout with a central nave, lined by Corinthian grey marble columns separating this from the flanking aisles, and ending in three semicircular apses. The central nave is tall.

== Gallery ==
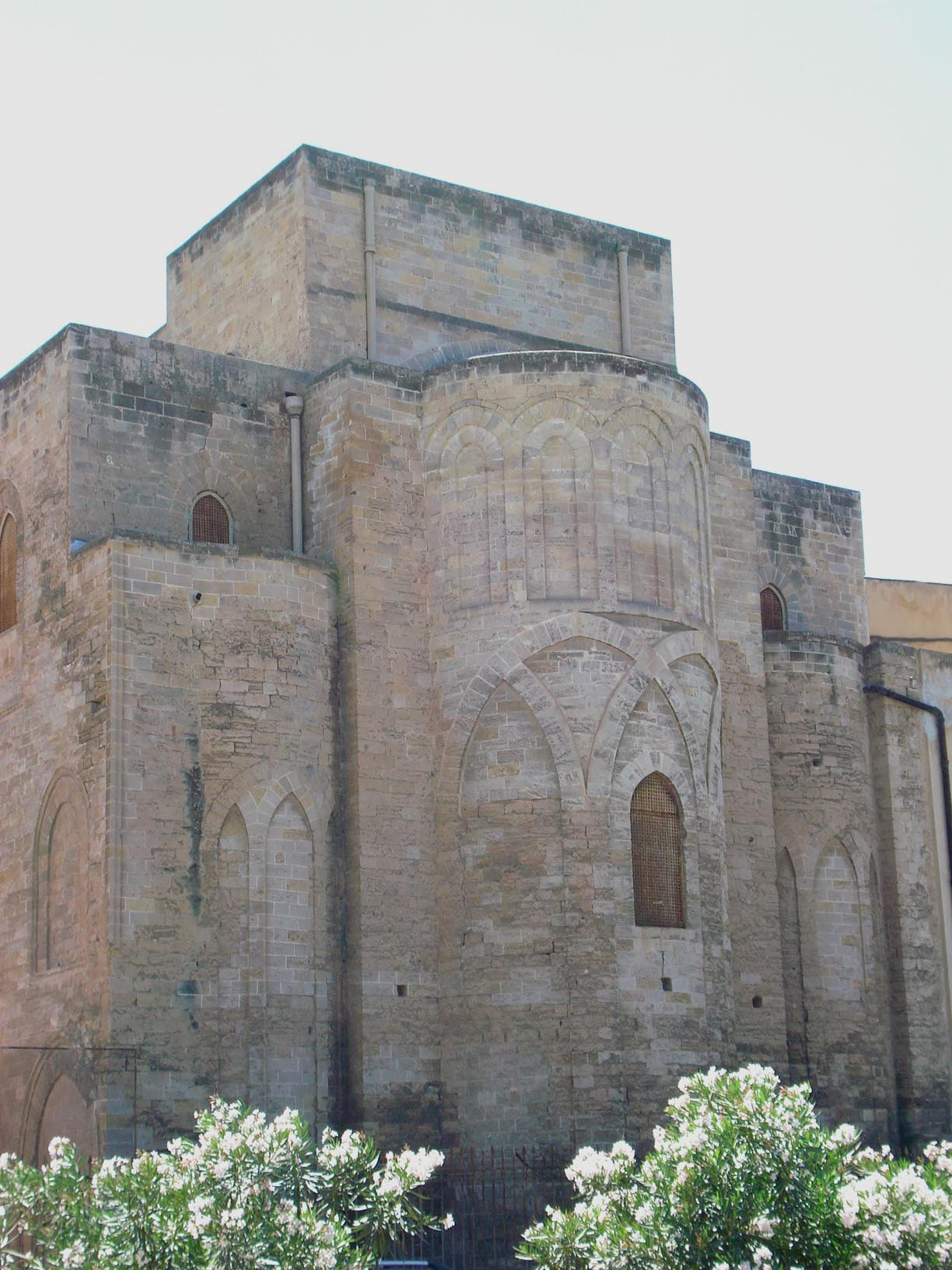
Apse

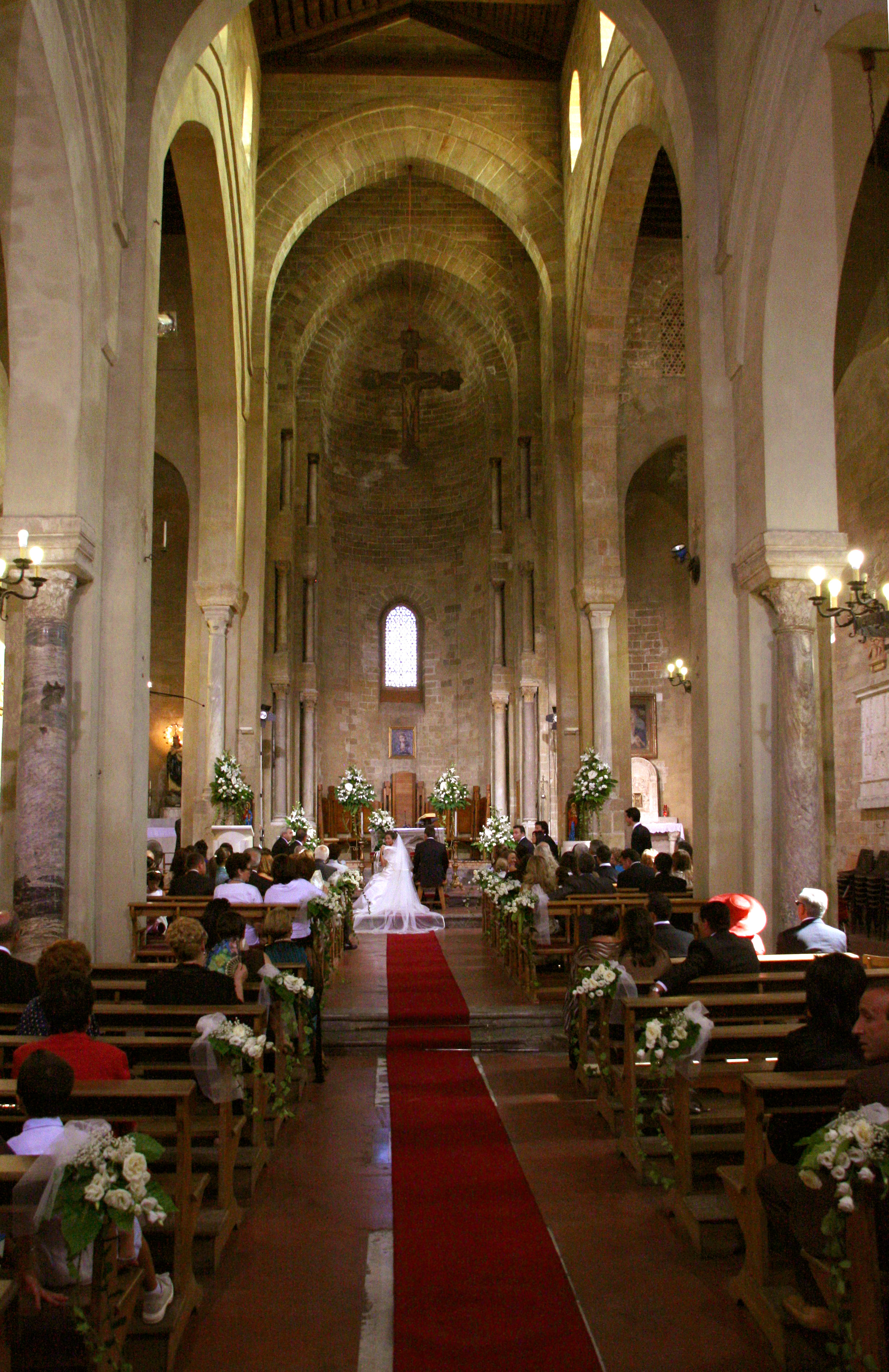
Interior. Central nave

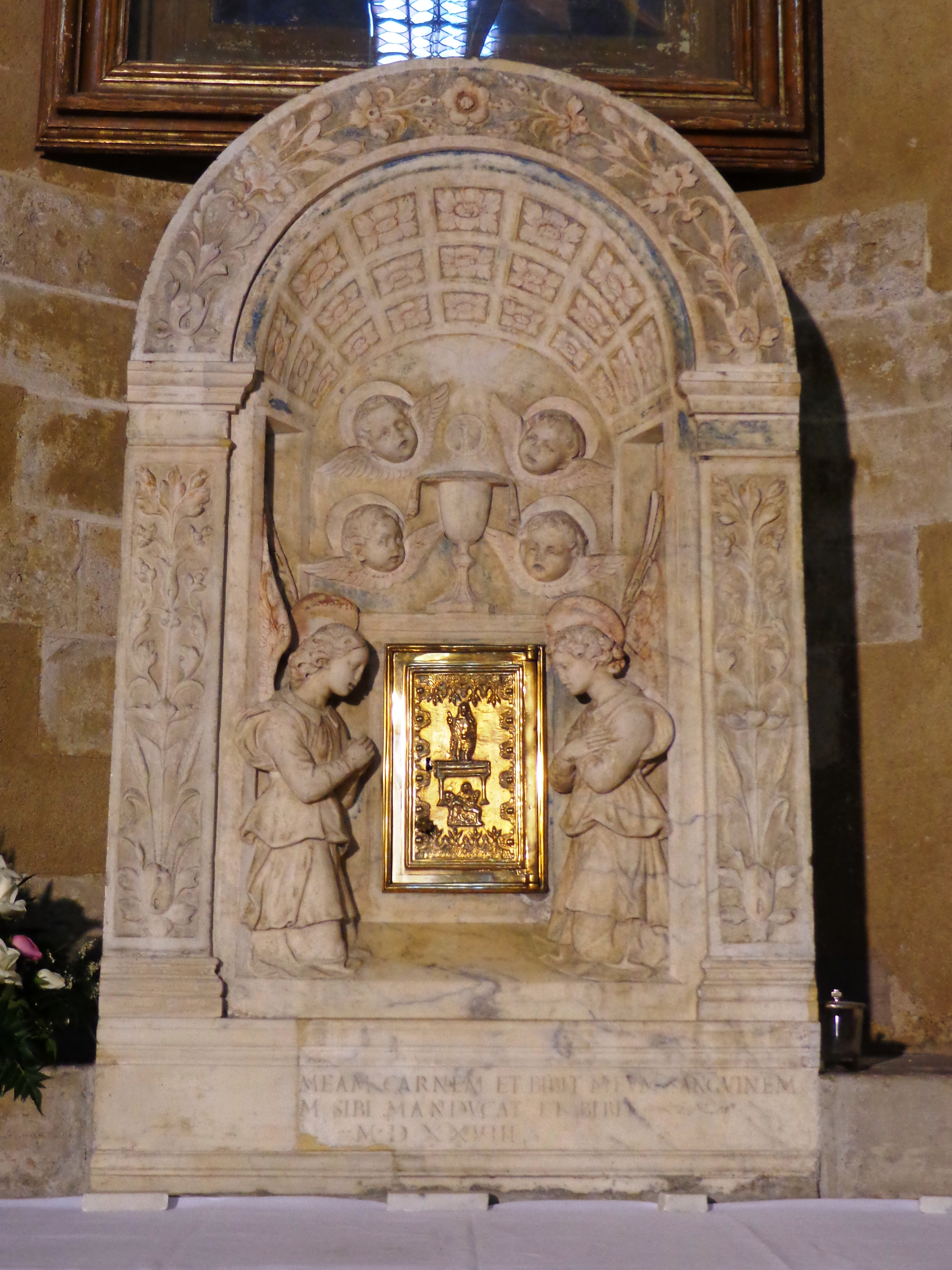
Tabernacle

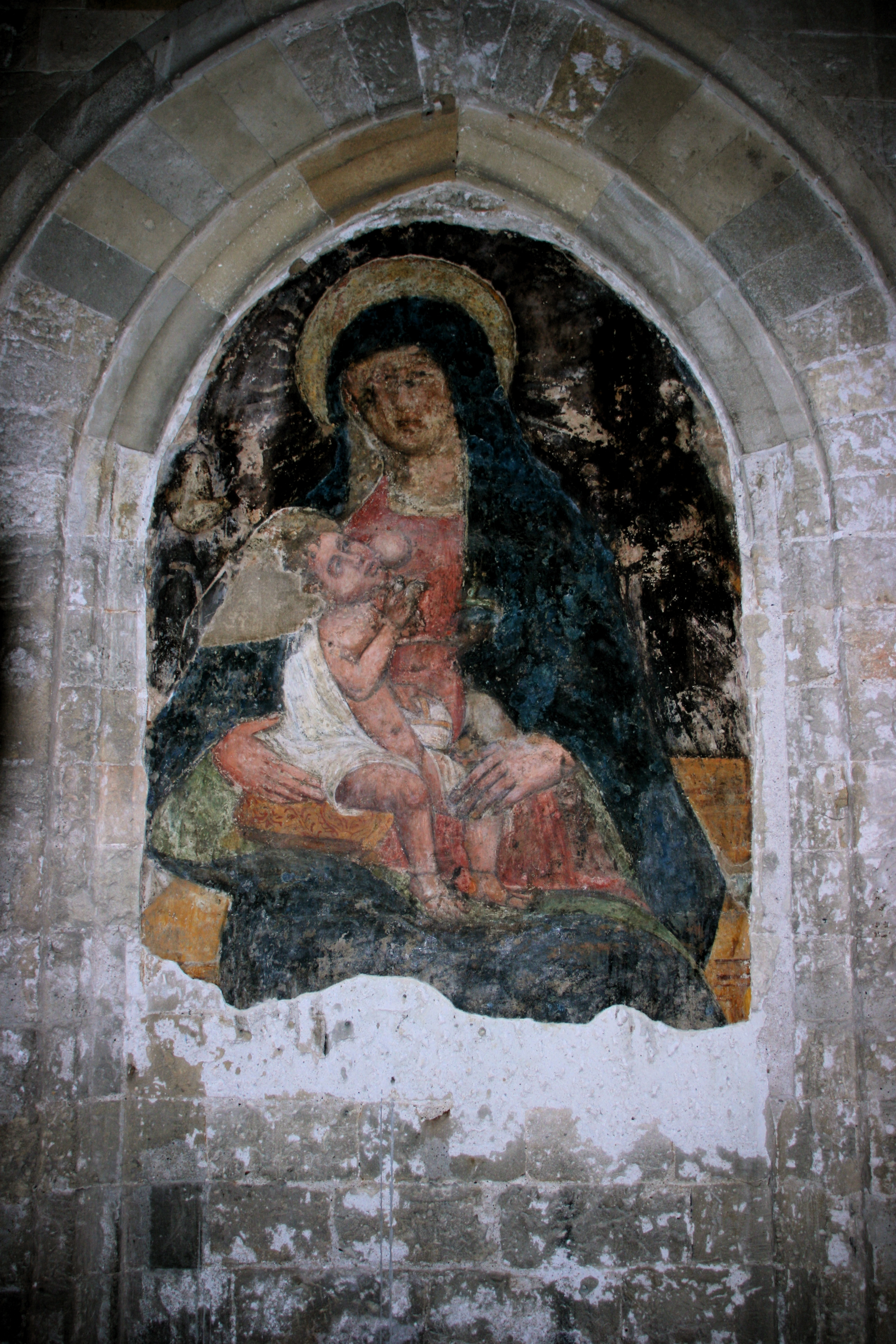
Fresco of Madonna delle Grazie

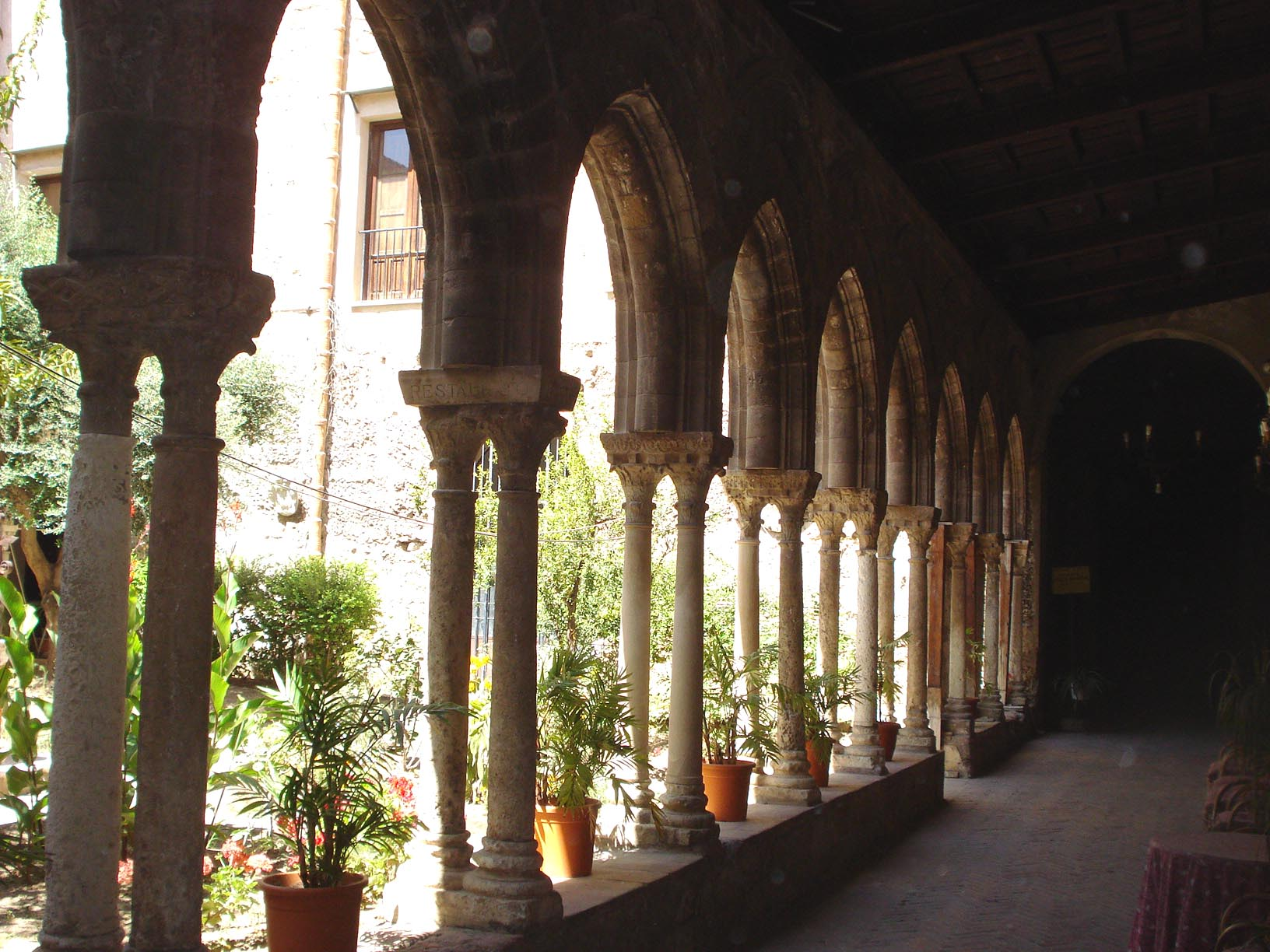
Cloister

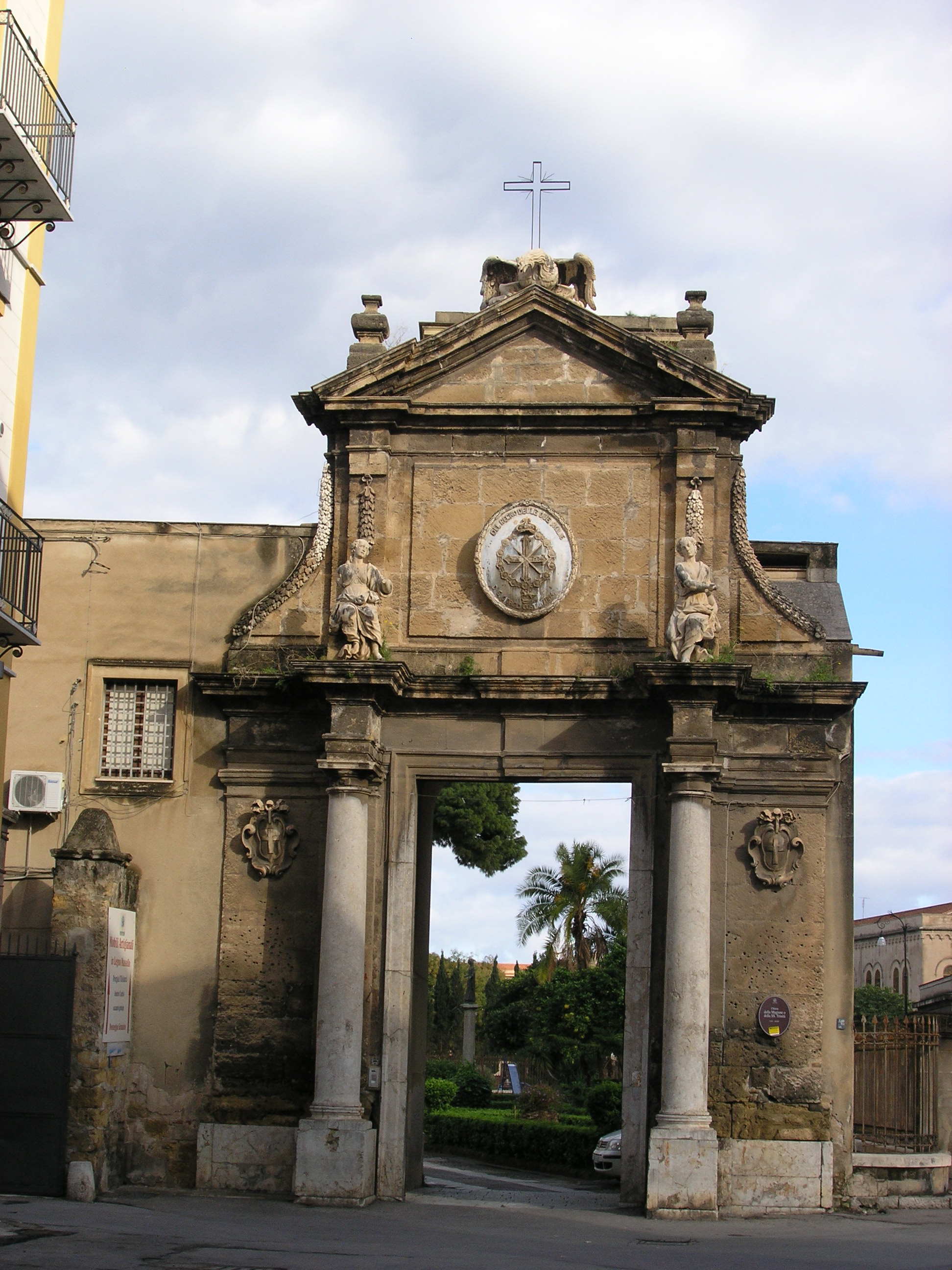
Portal of the complex
