= Irene Angelina =

Queen of Sicily (1193) and Germany (1198–1208)

Queen consort of Sicily
- Tenure: 1193

Queen consort of Germany
- Tenure: 1198–1208
- Born: c. 1181; Constantinople, Byzantine Empire
- Died: 27 August 1208 (aged 26–27); Hohenstaufen Castle, Holy Roman Empire
- Burial: Lorch Abbey
- Spouse: Roger III, King of Sicily; Philip, King of Germany
- Issue: Beatrix, Holy Roman Empress; Maria, Hereditary Princess of Brabant; Kunigunde, Queen of Bohemia; Elisabeth, Queen of Castile
- House: Angelos
- Father: Isaac II Angelos
- Mother: Irene Tornikina

Irene Angelina (Greek: Εἰρήνη Ἀγγελίνα; c. 1181 – 27 August 1208) was a Byzantine princess and member of the Angelos dynasty and by her two marriages Queen of Sicily in 1193 and Queen of Germany from 1198 to 1208.

== Life ==
Irene was born in Constantinople (modern-day Istanbul, Turkey), the second daughter of Byzantine emperor Isaac II Angelos and his first wife Irene, likely a Tornikina.

In 1193, her father and King Tancred of Sicily arranged Irene's marriage with Tancred's eldest son, Roger. Her husband was declared co-king, but he died on 24 December 1193, shortly before his father's death on 20 February 1194. Sicily was claimed by Tancred's aunt Constance and her husband, Emperor Henry VI. Irene was captured 29 December 1194 during the conquest of Sicily. She was married on 25 May 1197 to Henry's younger brother, Duke Philip of Swabia, and took the name Maria.

After the emperor had died on 28 September, Philip was elected King of the Romans in Mühlhausen on 8 March 1198. Irene's father, who had been deposed in 1195, urged her to get Philip's support for his reinstatement; her brother, Alexius, subsequently spent some time at Philip's court during the preparations for the Fourth Crusade. She thus had an early influence on the eventual diversion of the crusade to Constantinople in 1204. Rivaled by the Welf scion Otto IV, Philip was able to consolidate his rule over the German kingdom. On 21 June 1208, he was killed by the Bavarian Count Palatine Otto VIII of Wittelsbach, leaving Irene widowed a second time.

After the murder of her husband, Irene, who was pregnant at the time, retired to Hohenstaufen Castle (modern-day Germany). Two months later, on 27 August 1208, she gave birth to another daughter. Both Irene and her child died shortly afterwards. She was buried in the family mausoleum in the Staufen proprietary monastery of Lorch Abbey, along with her children.

== Issue ==
Philip and Irene had:

- Beatrix (April/June 1198 – 11 August 1212), who married her father's rival, Emperor Otto IV on 22 July 1212 and died three weeks later without issue.
- Maria (1199/1200 – 29 March 1235), who married Duke Henry II of Brabant before 22 August 1215 and had issue.
- Kunigunde (February/March 1202 – 13 September 1248), who married King Wenceslaus I of Bohemia in 1224 and had issue.
- Elisabeth (March/May 1205 – 5 November 1235), who married King Ferdinand III of Castile on 30 November 1219 and had issue.
- Daughter (posthumously born and died 20/27 August 1208). She and her mother died following childbirth complications.

Sources identified two short-lived sons, Reinald and Frederick, also born from the union of Philip and Irene-Maria Angelina, being both buried at Lorch Abbey alongside their mother. However, there were no contemporary sources who could ascertain their existence without doubt.

== Legacy ==
In his poem on King Philip's Magdeburg Christmas celebrations, the minnesinger Walther von der Vogelweide described Irene as rose ane dorn, ein tube sunder gallen (Middle High German for "rose without a thorn, a dove without gall").

== Sources ==
- O city of Byzantium: annals of Niketas Choniates tr. Harry J. Magoulias (Detroit: Wayne State University Press, 1984).
- Bruno W. Häuptli: IRENE (Angelou) von Byzanz, in: Biographisch-Bibliographisches Kirchenlexikon (BBKL), vol. 28, Bautz, Nordhausen 2007, ISBN 978-3-88309-413-7, pp. 858–862.
- Alemparte, Jaime Ferreiro (1986). "Acercamiento Mutuo de Espana y Alemania". In Martín, Antonio Pérez (ed.). España y Europa, un pasado jurídico común (in Spanish). Cometa S.A.
- Alio, Jacqueline (2018). Queens of Sicily 1061-1266. Trinacria (New York).
- Baldwin, Philip B. (2014). Pope Gregory X and the Crusades. The Boydell Press.
- Ciggaar, Krijna Nelly (1996). Western Travellers to Constantinople: The West and Byzantium, 962-1204. Brill.
- Stürner, Wolfgang (1992). Friedrich II:Teil 1 Die Konigscheffschaft in Sizilien un Deutschland 1194-1220 (in German). Wissenschaftliche Buchgesellschaft.
- Weller, Tobias (2010). Dynastische Politik (in German). Vienna: Andrea Rzihacek, Renate Spreitzer: Philipp von Schwaben. Beiträge der internationalen Tagung anlässlich seines 800. Todestages, Wien, 29. bis 30. Mai 2008. pp. 193–214.
- Previte-Orton, C.W. (1977). The Shorter Cambridge Medieval History. Vol. 1:The Later Roman Empire to the Twelfth Century. Cambridge University Press.
- Houben, Hubert (2002). Roger II of Sicily: A Ruler Between East and West. Translated by Milburn, Diane; Loud, Graham A. Cambridge University Press.

Irene Angelina Angelid Born: c. 1181 Died: 1208
Royal titles
Preceded by Sibylla of Acerra	Queen consort of Sicily; 1193; Served alongside: Sibylla of Acerra	Succeeded by Sibylla of Acerra
Preceded by Constance of Sicily	Queen consort of Germany; 1198–1208	Succeeded by Beatrice of Swabia
Preceded by Constance of Hungary	Duchess consort of Swabia; 1197–1208	Succeeded by Constance of Aragon
