= Sibylla of Acerra =

12th-century Queen of Sicily

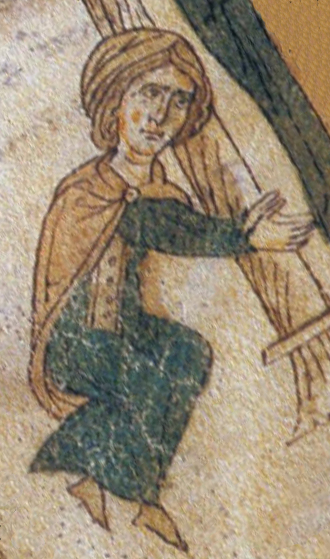
Sibylla of Acerra.

Sibylla of Acerra (1153–1205) was Queen of Sicily as the wife of King Tancred. After Tancred's death, she was regent in 1194 for their son, King William III. She was a member of the noble d'Aquino family, and the sister of Count Richard of Acerra.

== Life ==
Tancred was always in a struggle with his aunt Empress Constance and her husband, the Holy Roman Emperor Henry VI, who had been claiming the Kingdom of Sicily since Tancred's accession. In 1191 Henry attempted to invade Sicily but failed and retreated, while Constance was left behind and captured.

Tancred initially placed Constance at Palermo under the supervision of Queen Sibylla, with Constance eating with Sibylla and sleeping in her bedroom. Sibylla strongly opposed Tancred honoring Constance, believing this would implicitly acknowledge the claim of the latter. Finding the local populace was sympathetic to Constance with whom she once quarreled, Sibylla suggested Constance be put to death, but Tancred, worrying this would harm his popularity, and viewing Constance's hostageship as a chance to force Henry into a truce, did not agree. So, as suggested by Tancred, she went for a discussion with Chancellor Matthew d'Ajello on where to imprison Constance, and in her presence Matthew wrote a letter managing to persuade Tancred to imprison the empress in the Castel dell'Ovo at Naples, a castle on an island surrounded by water. However, under pressure from Pope Celestine III, Tancred was forced to send Constance to Rome in exchange for recognition from the Pope; en route, Constance was freed by German soldiers, in the summer of 1192.

Tancred died in February 1194 and the Kingdom of Sicily passed to his young son William III with Queen Sibylla as regent. Sibylla also tried to ensure that Pope Celestine III would crown William III, age eight. When Henry VI crossed the Strait of Messina in autumn 1194, Sibylla negotiated an agreement whereby William III, who had been whisked off to safety, should retain the County of Lecce and Principality of Taranto.

Sibylla attended the coronation of Henry in the Cathedral of Palermo on Christmas Day 1194. Days after this event, Queen Sibylla and her supporters Nicholas of Ajello (son of Matthew), the Archbishop of Salerno, and Margaritus of Brindisi were arrested and imprisoned in Germany with her son and daughters. Sibylla and her daughters were placed in a convent from which they managed to escape to France while Pope Innocent III petitioned Henry for her release. Her brother Richard was hanged by Henry in revenge for the capture of Constance.

== Issue ==
- Roger III, duke of Apulia and king of Sicily
- William III, duke of Apulia and king of Sicily
- Elvira, countess of Lecce after the death of her brother; married firstly Walter III of Brienne, secondly Giacomo Sanseverino, Count of Tricario, and thirdly Tigrini Guidi, Count of Modigliano (or Count Palatine in Tuscany?)
- Constance, married Pietro Ziani, later Doge of Venice
- Medania
- Valdrada, married Giacomo Tiepolo, Doge of Venice

Royal titles
Preceded by Joan of England	Queen consort of Sicily along with Irene Angelina c. 1189 – 20 February 1194	Succeeded by Constance of Aragon
