= Margaritus of Brindisi =

12th-century Sicilian naval commander

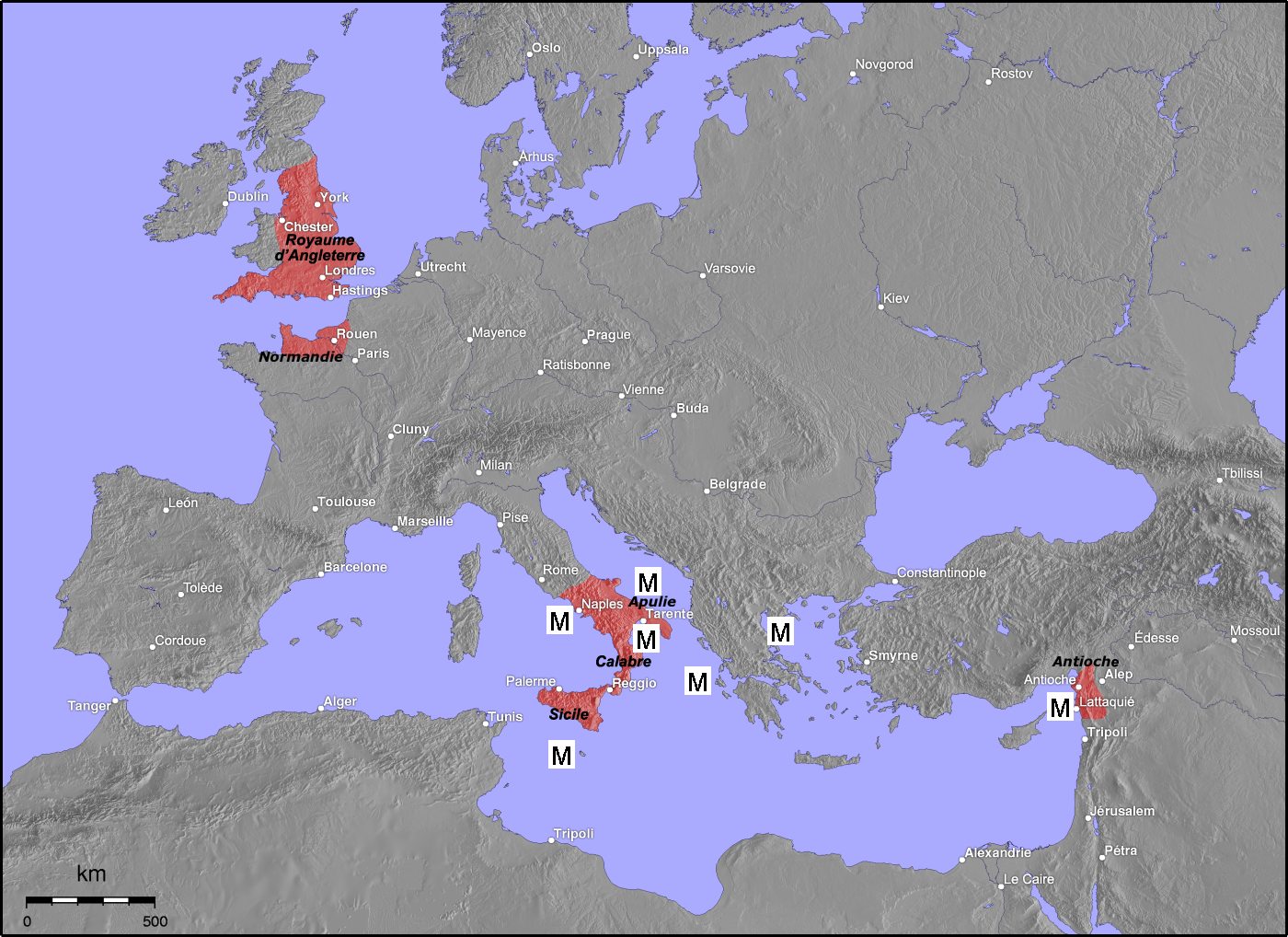
Europe, with 12th-century Norman possessions in color, and M marking points of action of Margaritus of Brindisi

Margaritus of Brindisi (also Margarito; Italian: Margaritone, Greek: Megareites or Margaritoni [Μαργαριτώνη]; c. 1149 – 1197), called "the new Neptune", was the last great ammiratus ammiratorum (Grand Admiral) of the Kingdom of Sicily. Following in the footsteps of Christodulus, George of Antioch and Maio of Bari, Margaritus commanded the kingdom's fleets during the reigns of William II (1166–1189) and Tancred (1189–1194). He probably began as a Greek pirate and gradually rose to the rank of privateer before becoming a permanent admiral of the navy. In 1185, he became the first count palatine of Cephalonia and Zakynthos. In 1192, he became the first Count of Malta.

== Biography ==
Margaritus first appears in the historical record as a leader of the Sicilian fleet alongside Tancred, then Count of Lecce, which took the island of Cephalonia, Zakynthos and Ithaca in 1185 and then harassed the fleet of Byzantine Emperor Isaac II Angelos at Cyprus and captured many of his ships, taking them back to Sicily. In autumn 1187, King William II sent Margaritus with a fleet to the Holy Land, where, on 2 October, Saladin had captured Jerusalem. Margaritus, with 60 ships and 200 knights, patrolled the Palestine coast constantly, preventing Saladin from taking any of the vital seaports of the Latin crusader kingdom. In July 1188, he arrived at Tripoli and forced Saladin to raise the siege of Krak des Chevaliers. Similar episodes happened at Marqab, Latakia and Tyre in the following year. On 11 November 1189, William II died and his fleet returned. On 4 October 1190, Margaritus, the strategos Jordan du Pin, and many other nobles of Messina were forced to flee when the English king Richard the Lionheart sacked the city and burnt it. Margaritus took little part thereafter in the Third Crusade.

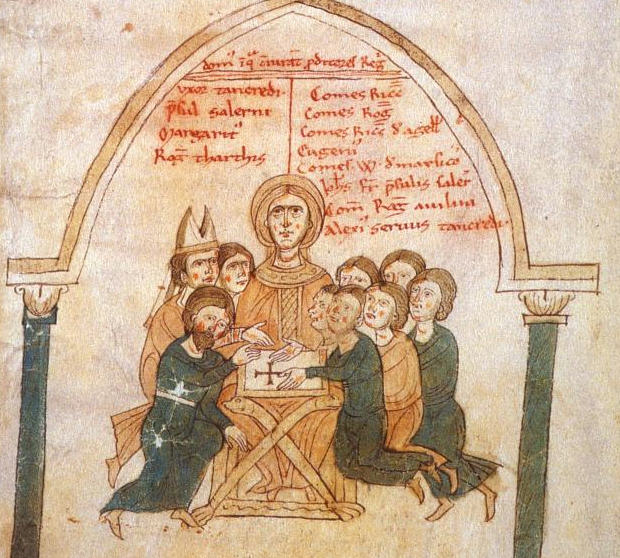
Margaritus with Sibylla and the alleged plotters

Margaritus was a staunch supporter of Tancred against Henry VI, King of Germany, who had married Constance, the aunt of both Tancred and William II. Henry thereby claimed the Kingdom of Sicily and besieged Naples in 1191. Margaritus came to the city's defence, harassing Henry's Pisan navy, nearly destroying the late-arriving Genoese contingent, and keeping the harbour approaches open. Salerno had surrendered to Henry and invited Constance there, but when Henry was forced to retreat, its population turned against Constance and captured her, and it was Margaritus who delivered her to Messina to Tancred on a typical bireme galley or dromon. Tancred made Margaritus the first count of Malta sometime in 1192, perhaps for this unexpected success, granting him considerable resources.

The war for the kingdom, however, was not given up. Tancred was forced to release Constance the same year, and later Henry sent a second, more powerful navy—mostly Pisan and Genoese—to Naples under the command of Markward von Anweiler. The fleet was augmented by fifty galleys from King Richard the Lionheart, who was forced to promise his support as part of the conditions of his release from a German prison. It landed in the Neapolitan bay on 25 August 1194; Naples surrendered. Palermo, where Margaritus defended the citadel, surrendered next, on November 20.

According to Roger of Howden, Henry confirmed Margaritus as admiral and gave him the "duchy of Durazzo" (ducatus de Duraz), by which he probably means Cephalonia, Zakynthos and Ithaca. Margaritus and many nobles of the old guard, including Nicholas, Archbishop of Salerno, the son of Matthew of Ajello, Tancred's widow, Sibylla of Acerra, and Tancred's brief successor, William III, were present at the Christmas coronation. However, four days later, they were arrested on charges of conspiracy and sent to Germany. Margaritus was blinded and died there in 1197, though Howden reports that the blind Margaritus was killed in Rome by a servant of his during the 1200s, by which time he had gone to Brindisi where he had gathered a fleet in the service of Philip II, King of France.

== Family ==
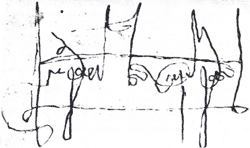
The signature of Margaritus of Brindisi

He married Marina or Martina, the illegitimate daughter of Roger II of Sicily. Karl Hopf's undocumented conjecture that two of Margaritus' daughters married, respectively, Riccardo Orsini, therefore ruler of the county of Cephalonia and Zakynthos, and Leone Vetrano, ruler of Corfu from 1199 until his execution by the Venetians in 1206, has been rejected by modern scholarship.

== Sources ==
- Norwich, John Julius. The Kingdom in the Sun 1130-1194. Longman: London, 1970.
- Annales Ianuenses Otoboni Scribae, in Annali Genovesi di Caffaro e de' suoi continuatori, ii (1189-1196). ed L. T. Belgrano and C. Imperiale di Sant'Angelo (Fonti per la storia d'Italia, 1902), pp. 38–41, 45–53.
- Garufi, C. A. "Margarito di Brindisi, conte di Malta e ammiraglio del re di Sicilia," in: Miscellanea di archeologia, storia e filologia dedicata al prof. Antonino Salinas, Palermo 1907, 273–282.
- Kiesewetter, Andreas (2008). "Margarito di Brindisi". Dizionario Biografico degli Italiani (in Italian). Vol. 70: Marcora–Marsilio. Rome: Istituto dell'Enciclopedia Italiana. ISBN 978-88-12-00032-6.
- Kiesewetter, Andreas (2006). "Preludio alla Quarta Crociata? Megareites di Brindisi, Maio di Cefalonia e la signoria sulle isole ionie (1185-1250)". In Ortalli, Gherardo; Schreiner, Peter; Ravegnani, Giorgio (eds.). Quarta Crociata. Venezia - Bisanzio - Impero latino. Atti delle giornate di studio. Venezia, 4-8 maggio 2004 (in Italian). Venice: Istituto veneto di scienze, lettere ed arti. pp. 317–358. ISBN 978-8-8881-4374-3.
