= Beatrice of Rethel =

Queen of Sicily from 1151 to 1154

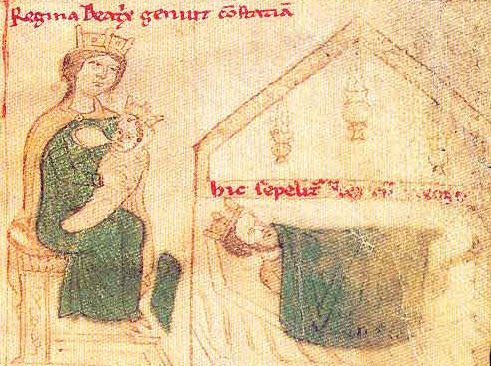
- Beatrice and her daughter Constance next to King Roger on his deathbed. This illustration shows Beatrice holding her infant daughter in her arms; however, Constance was born almost nine months after her father's death.

Queen consort of Sicily
- Tenure: 1151 – 26 February 1154
- Born: 1130/35
- Died: 30 March 1185
- Spouse: Roger II of Sicily
- Issue: Constance I of Sicily
- Father: Guitier, Count of Rethel
- Mother: Beatrix of Namur

Beatrice of Rethel (1130/35 – 30 March 1185) was a French noblewoman and Queen of Sicily as the third wife of Roger II.

== Family ==
Beatrice was born in 1130 or 1135, the eldest daughter and one of the nine children of Guitier of Rethel and Beatrix of Namur. Her father was Count of Rethel from 1158 to 1171.

== Marriage, issue and widowhood ==
In 1151, Beatrice married Roger II of Sicily. She was queen for three years, until Roger's death on 26 February 1154. Beatrice was a little over three weeks pregnant at the time of his death, and their only child, Constance, was born the following November.

Beatrice survived her husband by thirty-one years but there is no record of her having married again. Her daughter Constance was confined to a monastery as a nun since childhood due a prophecy that "her marriage would destroy the kingdom". Beatrice lived long enough to see her betrothed in 1184. Constance became queen of Sicily in 1194.

== Sources ==
- Alio, Jacqueline (2018). Queens of Sicily 1061-1266. Trinacria Editions (Sicilian Medieval Studies).
- Houben, Hubert (2002). Roger II of Sicily: A Ruler Between East and West. Translated by Loud, G.A.; Loud, Diane. Cambridge University Press.
- Metcalfe, Alex (2009). Muslims of Medieval Italy. Edinburgh University Press.
- Schipa, Michaelangelo (1957). "Italy and Sicily under Frederick II". In Tanner, J.R.; Previté-Orton, C. W.; Brooke, Z.N. (eds.). The Cambridge Medieval History. Vol. IV. Cambridge University Press.
- Stürner, Wolfgang (1992). Friedrich II.: Die Königsherrschaft in Sizilien und Deutschland 1194-1220. Wissenschaftliche Buchgesellschaft.
- Ullmann, Walter (2003). A Short History of the Papacy in the Middle Ages. Routledge.

Royal titles
Preceded by Sibylla of Burgundy	Queen consort of Sicily; 1151 – 26 February 1154	Succeeded by Margaret of Navarre
