= Constance of Sicily, Dogaressa of Venice =

Sicilian Princess

Constance of Sicily (floruit 1220) was a Sicilian Princess and the Dogaressa of Venice 1213–1229 by marriage to the Doge Pietro Ziani (r. 1205–1229).

She was the daughter of Tancred, King of Sicily, and Sibylla of Acerra. Her father died in 1194, and her brother was deposed later that same year, by Henry VI, Holy Roman Emperor, who also captured Constance, her mother and her two sisters.

She married the Doge Pietro Ziani in 1213, after the death of his former dogaressa Maria Baseggio. The marriage was arranged on the suggestion of the doge as a confirmation and renewal of the Treaty of Venice between Sicily and Venice, which had been forged by the father of Pietro Ziani, doge Sebastiano Ziani, and William II of Sicily, the predecessor of Constance's father. This was the first time a Doge of Venice had married a Princess since Theodora Anna Doukaina Selvo in the 11th-century.

She was described as beautiful and dignified, "a woman of conspicuous ability and ambition" and well suited to play the part of a princely consort of the ambitious Doge. She is described by Palazzi:

"A Queen by birth, Dogaressa of Venice by marriage, she exhibited all the attributes of her royal station, — she was also Duchess of Calabria, — and her high breeding, no less than her beauty, raised her above all petty jealousies."

She was said to respond to all complaints about herself or her spouse with the words: "I have nothing to do with you!" The marriage between Constance and Ziani are described as a happy one. Pietro Ziani had only one child, a son, from his first marriage, who died as a child, but his second marriage produced Marco, Marchesina and Maria.

There are three versions of her death. One version claim that she died during the earthquake of 1220. A second version that she died suddenly in 1228, and that the Doge took it so badly that he abdicated and died soon after. The third version claim that she was still alive when Pietro Ziani left his office in 1229 and that they lived a peaceful life for several years in retirement in their palace on Santa Giustina.

In 1242, her sister Valdrada of Sicily was to become dogaressa by marriage to her husband's successor.
