= Sibylla of Burgundy =

Queen of Sicily from 1149 to 1150

This is an article about Sibylla of Burgundy, queen of Sicily. For her namesake, see Sibylla of Burgundy, Duchess of Burgundy.

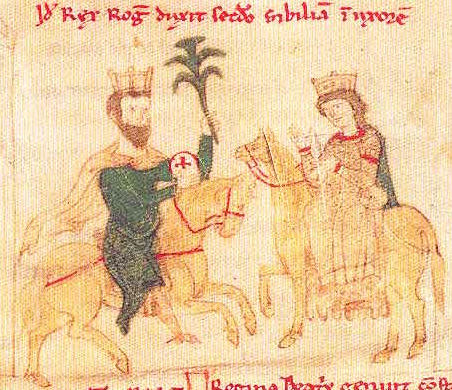
Sibylla with her husband.

Sibylla of Burgundy (1126 – 16 September 1150 in Salerno) was Queen of Sicily as the second consort of Roger II of Sicily.

She was a daughter of Hugh II, Duke of Burgundy, and his wife Felicia-Matilda of Mayenne.

In 1149, Sibylla married King Roger II of Sicily. They had two children:

- Henry (29 August 1149 – died young)
- Stillborn child (16 September 1150)

On 16 September 1150, Sibylla died of complications from her second childbirth. She was buried in the church of the Monastery of La Trinità della Cava de' Tirreni.

== Sources ==
- Alio, Jacqueline (2018). Queens of Sicily 1061-1266. Trinacria, New York. ISBN 9781943639144.
- Houben, Hubert (2002). Roger II of Sicily: Ruler between East and West. Translated by Loud, Graham A.; Milburn, Diane. Cambridge University Press.

Royal titles
| Preceded by Elvira of Castile | Queen consort of Sicily; 1149–1150 | Succeeded by Beatrice of Rethel |
