= Valdrada of Sicily =

Dogaressa of Venice

Valdrada of Sicily (died c. 1252) was a Sicilian princess and the Dogaressa of Venice 1242–1249 by her marriage to Doge Jacopo Tiepolo (r. 1229–1249).

Born at the very latest in 1194, Valdrada was the youngest child of King Tancred of Sicily and Sibylla of Acerra. Her father died in 1194, and her brother was deposed later that same year, by Henry VI, Holy Roman Emperor, who also captured Constance, her mother and her two sisters.

She married the Doge in 1242, after the death of his former dogaressa Maria Storlato (d. 1240). The wedding followed that of her sister Constance who had been married to her husband's predecessor as doge to confirm the Treaty of Venice between Sicily and Venice.

Her royal status and 'ostentation of Regal rank' in the Venetian Court has been suggested to have influenced the promulgation of what was called the "Promissione", which was instigated in 1242 and which stated that the Doge was not the executive Head of the State but only the executor of the orders of the council, and was no longer to be given homage; nor was the dogaressa or any relatives of her to be given any form of public office or power position, nore where they allowed to have a court or household larger than twenty-five free retainers and twenty-five slaves.

Dogaressa Valdrada has been described as dominant and forceful and is said to have had a great deal of control over her husband and the affairs of Venice. Reportedly, she had:

...good commonsense, and sound probity of life, and she assumed at once an unquestioned control over the actions of her Consort, strong man though he was. Like her sister, the Dowager Dogaressa Costanza, she was a virago, in the sense of a strong personality; and she followed in her sister's steps, ruling not alone her husband, but bending to her will all with whom she was thrown in contact.

Following Jacopo's resignation in early 1249, she lived with him at his private residence at Sant' Agostino, in San Polo. He died on 19 July 1249. She is said to have died three years later.

It is stated by Edgcumbe Staley in The Dogaressas of Venice that Valdrada had two young children. The accuracy of this statement is questionable, as at the time of her marriage to the Doge she was already well into her forties, and perhaps beyond the years of childbearing.

Preceded by Maria Storlato	Dogaressa of Venice; 1242–1249	Succeeded by Loicia da Prata
