= Pietro Ziani =

Doge of Venice from 1205 to 1229

His Serenity Pietro Ziani
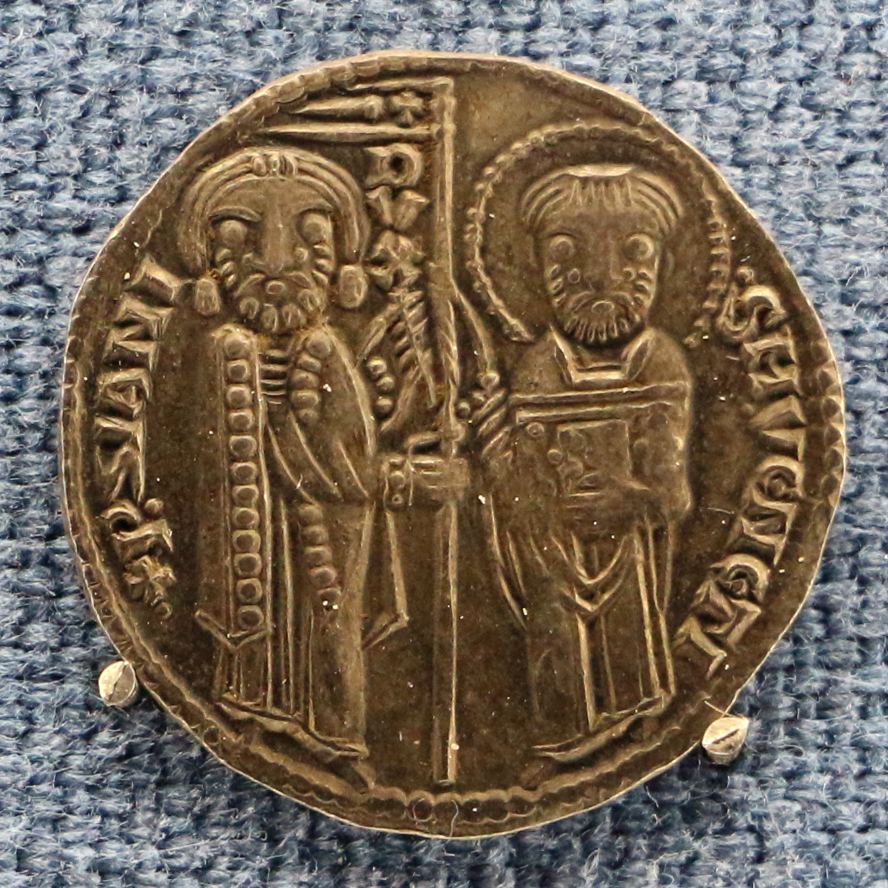
- Grosso of Pietro Ziani

Doge of Venice
- In office 1205–1229
- Preceded by: Enrico Dandolo
- Succeeded by: Jacopo Tiepolo

Personal details
- Born: Unknown Republic of Venice
- Died: 13 March 1230 Republic of Venice
- Spouses: Maria Baseggio (died 1209) Constance of Sicily (m. 1213)
- Parent: Sebastiano Ziani (father)

Pietro Ziani (died 13 March 1230) was the Doge of Venice from 15 August 1205 to 1229, succeeding Enrico Dandolo. He was the son of Doge Sebastian Ziani of the very rich noble family. He was married to Maria Baseggio and Constance of Sicily.

In his youth a sailor, he commanded a flotilla escorting the emperor Frederick Barbarossa in 1177, took also part in the Fourth Crusade and sacking of Constantinople. After his election, Ziani is said to consider the transfer of the capital of the Republic to Constantinople, but eventually the Council decided against it. Instead, he organized the Venetian acquisitions in the territory of the Latin Empire: Crete, Corfu, other islands and the substantial part of Constantinople itself, demanding an oath from the Venetian colony in the city. Ziani established also commercial ties with the post-Byzantine states, signing in 1210 a treaty with the despotate of Epirus under Michael I Komnenos Doukas.

According to the Cronaca Altinate, he strove to maintain peace with Padua after an incident at a festival in Treviso so that Venice could concentrate on its new Greek territories. He was forced to fend off a Paduan invasion in the War of the Castle of Love (1215).

Ziani abdicated in February 1229. He was succeeded by his brother-in-law, Jacopo Tiepolo, but Ziani refused to meet him and died a year later. He is buried in the church of San Giorgio Maggiore.

Political offices
Preceded by Enrico Dandolo	Doge of Venice; 1205–1229	Succeeded by Jacopo Tiepolo
