= Constance I of Sicily =

Holy Roman Empress (1191–1197) and Queen of Sicily (r. 1194–1198)

Constance I
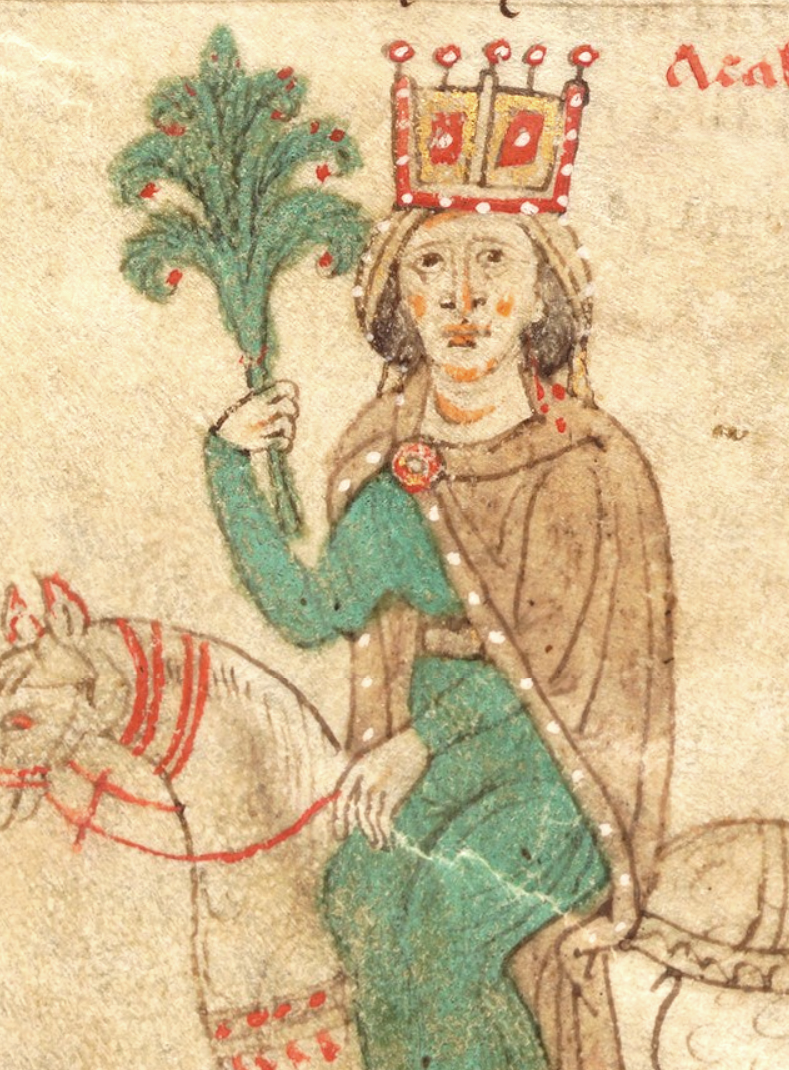
- Depiction from Liber ad Honorem Augusti by Peter of Eboli, 1196

Queen of Sicily
- Reign: 25 December 1194 – 27 November 1198
- Predecessor: William III
- Successor: Frederick I
- Co-rulers: Henry I (1194–1197); Frederick I (1198)

Holy Roman Empress consort
- Tenure: 15 April 1191 – 28 September 1197
- Born: 2 November 1154; Palermo, Kingdom of Sicily
- Died: 27 November 1198 (aged 44); Palermo, Kingdom of Sicily
- Spouse: Henry VI, Holy Roman Emperor (m. 1186; died 1197)
- Issue: Frederick II, Holy Roman Emperor
- House: Hauteville
- Father: Roger II of Sicily
- Mother: Beatrice of Rethel

Constance I (Italian: Costanza; 2 November 1154 – 27 November 1198) was the queen of Sicily from 1194 until her death and Holy Roman Empress from 1191 to 1197 as the wife of Emperor Henry VI.

As queen regnant of Sicily, she reigned jointly with her spouse and later with her infant son, the future Holy Roman Emperor Frederick II. She is particularly notable for her actions against her own family, the Norman kings of Sicily; she played an important role in the end of the Hauteville presence in Sicily.

Despite being the sole heir to the throne of Sicily, she did not marry until she was 30 due to a prophecy; shortly after becoming empress, she was involved in the succession war against her illegitimate nephew King Tancred for the Sicilian throne, during which she was captured, though she was later released unharmed. In the history of the Holy Roman Empire, only two empresses were captured, with the other being her mother-in-law Empress Beatrice.

Shortly before ascending the Sicilian throne, at the age of 40, she gave birth to her only child, Frederick, thus continuing the bloodlines of both the Holy Roman Empire and the Kingdom of Sicily.

After the death of her husband, she gave up her son's claim to the throne of the Holy Roman Empire in favor of her younger brother-in-law Philip of Swabia, making her son merely king of Sicily. She, however, continued to use her imperial title. She died one year later, having entrusted her young son to Pope Innocent III.

== Background and marriage ==
Constance was the posthumous daughter of King Roger II by his third wife Beatrice of Rethel. Constance, unusually for a princess, was not betrothed until she was thirty, which later gave rise to stories that she had become a nun and required papal dispensation to marry. Boccaccio related in his De mulieribus claris that a prediction that "her marriage would destroy Sicily" led to her confinement to remain celibate, and by the 15th century, the monastery of Santissimo Salvatore, Palermo, claimed Constance as a former member.

In the spring of 1168, during the reign in Messina of her elder nephew King William II, opposition to the Chancellor, Stephen du Perche, grew intense. A rumor spread that William had been murdered, and that the Chancellor planned to put his brother on the throne by marriage to Constance, even though William had a brother, Henry of Capua. Stephen was finally forced to flee.

Henry died in 1172, as King William II did not marry until 1177 and his marriage remained childless (or ever had a son named Bohemond in 1181), Constance became the sole heir to the Sicilian crown; nonetheless, while said to have been designated the heir and sworn fealty to in 1174, she remained confined to her convent with her marriage seemingly beyond consideration until she was 30 years old.

Her betrothal to Henry, King of the Romans, was announced 29 Oct 1184 at the Augsburg episcopal palace, an event that Pope Lucius III initiated rather than objected to. In 1185, Constance traveled to Milan to celebrate the wedding, accompanied by a grand procession of princes and barons. Henry accompanied her to Salerno in August but had to return to Germany for the funeral of his mother. On August 28 Constance was greeted in the province of Rieti by ambassadors from the Emperor. Henry and Constance were married on 27 January 1186 at Basilica of Sant'Ambrogio, Milan. In exchange for the marriage, Emperor Frederick I agreed to relinquish his claim to southern Italy. Before leaving Sicily, William II had three important nobles (his cousin Tancred, Count of Lecce, Roger of Andria, and vice chancellor Matthew of Ajello) swear fealty to her as the probable successor to the throne at the curia of Troia. Matthew strongly opposed this marriage. Abulafia (1988) points out that William did not foresee the union of German and Sicilian crowns as a serious eventuality; his purpose was to consolidate an alliance with an erstwhile enemy of Norman power in Italy. Another aim of William in marrying Constance off was to prevent Tancred from claiming the throne.

Constance interceded in the succession conflict of her maternal grand-uncle Count Henry of Namur with her husband and father-in-law: Henry had designated his maternal nephew Baldwin V, Count of Hainaut as his heir while childless, but he had a daughter Ermesinde in 1186 and thus sought to replace Baldwin with her. Under the instruction of Frederick I, Baldwin succeeded to Namur in 1189 while Henry was still living.

The papacy, also an enemy of the emperors, did not want to see the kingdom of southern Italy (then one of the richest in Europe) in German hands, but Henry pressed Pope Celestine III to baptize and crown his son; the Pope put him off.

== Claim to Sicily ==
Knowing that Sicily's Norman aristocracy would not welcome a Hohenstaufen king, William made the nobles, and the important men of his court, promise to recognize Constance's succession if he died without direct heirs. Nevertheless, after his unexpected death in 1189, Tancred seized the throne. Tancred was illegitimate but he had the support of most of the great men of the kingdom such as Vice-Chancellor Matthew of Ajello. On the other hand, Archbishop Walter of the Mill and most of the aristocracy supported Constance. Matthew was able to induce Walter and other barons to support Tancred.

Joan of England, widow of William, believed Constance to be the rightful successor and vocally supported the Germans; in response Tancred put Queen Joan under house arrest and confiscated her vast estates, which enraged her brother King Richard I of England, who later rescued her.

=== First expedition ===
While Constance's father-in-law, Frederick Barbarossa, was on a crusade, Henry and Constance were forced to stay in Germany and could not press her claim to the Sicilian crown. Emperor Frederick died in 1190 and the following year Henry and Constance were crowned emperor and empress. Constance then accompanied her husband at the head of a substantial imperial army to forcefully take the Sicilian throne from Tancred with the support of the loyal Pisan fleet. The northern towns of the kingdom opened their gates to Henry, including the earliest Norman strongholds Capua and Aversa. Salerno, Roger II's mainland capital, sent word ahead that Henry was welcome and invited Constance to stay in her father's old palace to escape the summer heat, and take treatment from doctors for her infirm health. Though welcomed, Constance felt many citizens were still loyal to Tancred as they whispered in groups quietly.

At Naples, Henry met the first resistance of the whole campaign, and was held up well into the southern summer from May to August, by which time much of the army had succumbed to malaria and other diseases. Even Henry himself fell ill. Henry of Welf, who was also participating in the siege of Naples, deserted to Germany, falsely claimed that the emperor had died, and touted himself as a possible successor. Although Henry VI recovered, the imperial army was forced to withdraw from the kingdom altogether. Constance remained in Salerno with a small garrison as a sign that Henry would soon return.

==== Brief captivity ====
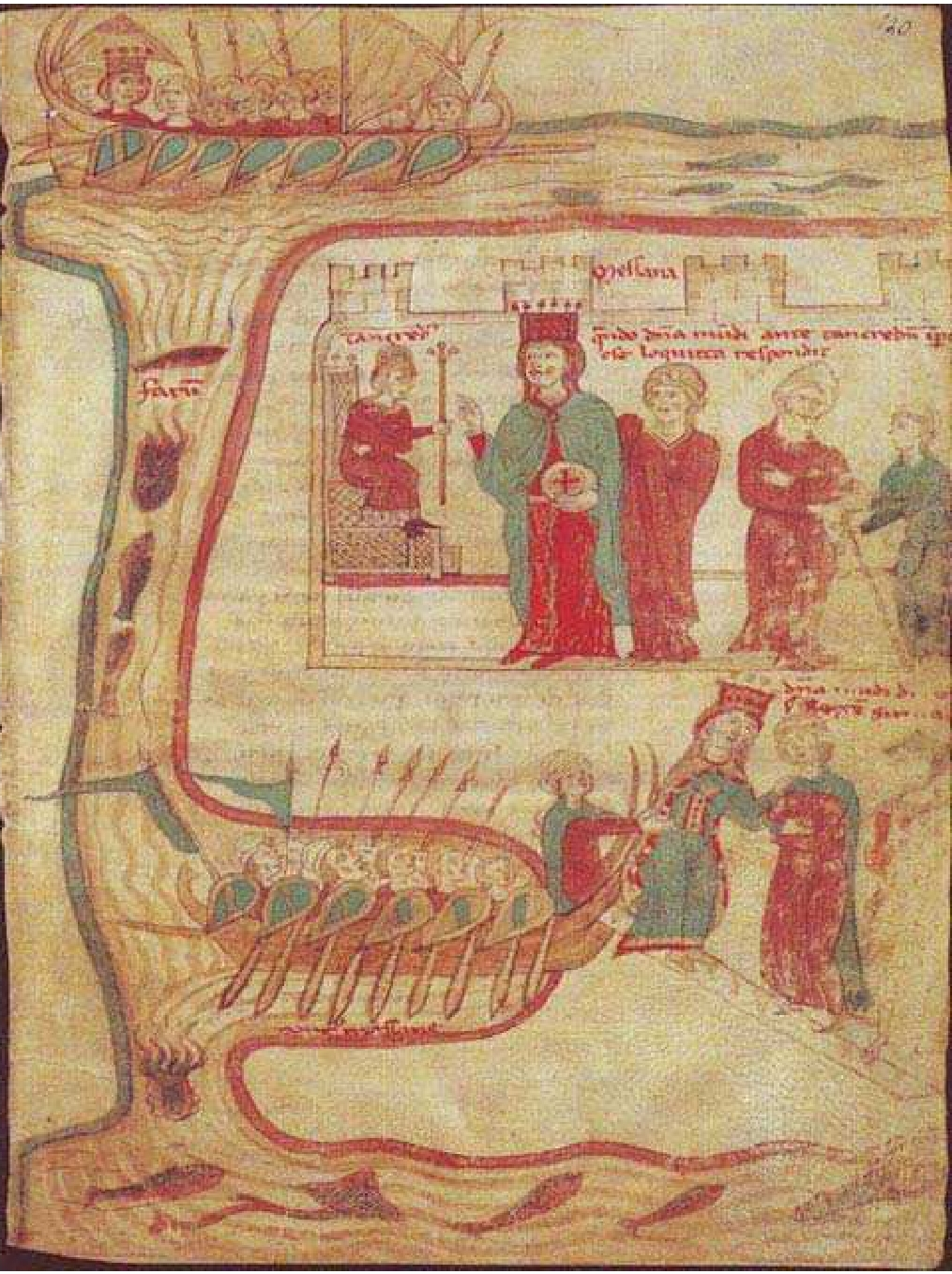
Constance imprisoned, from Liber ad honorem Augusti.

Once Henry had withdrawn with the bulk of the imperial army, the towns that had fallen to the Empire immediately declared their allegiance to Tancred, for the most part now fearing his retribution. Nicholas of Ajello, son of Matthew and former Archbishop of Salerno, who was helping defend Naples, wrote letters about the events to his friends in Salerno. Thus the populace of Salerno saw an opportunity to win some favour with Tancred, so they taunted and besieged the defenseless Constance at Castel Terracena. Constance presented herself on a balcony and spoke to them in the tone of mild remonstrance and admonition, trying to tell them that the situation might improve and the defeat of Henry might be exaggerated by Nicholas, but the Salernitans were determined to capture her for Tancred, so they continued the siege. Constance locked herself in her room, locked the windows, and prayed to God for help and revenge. After a rapid negotiation with Elia di Gesualdo, a distant relative of Tancred, Constance voluntarily went out under the condition that her German guards were allowed to leave unharmed. She was then arrested by Elia (and some barons of Apulia who were related to her) and delivered to Tancred in Messina by Admiral Margaritus of Brindisi (her brother-in-law who had helped in the defence of Naples), on a bireme galley or dromon with 200 rowers. She was in her attire as empress, wearing a dress quilted with gold and decorated with roses, a cloak covered with precious jewels, and her hair was strewn with gems, making her look like a goddess. Thus she became an important and valuable prize given that Henry had every intention of regaining. When meeting Constance, Tancred blamed her for the invasion, but she proudly responded that she was just taking back her dominion, stolen by Tancred. By September 20, Henry learned the abduction of his wife at Genoa.

Constance was taken to Palermo, supervised by Queen Sibylla; Tancred had her eat with Sibylla and sleep in Sibylla's bedroom. Sibylla, who had once quarrelled with Constance, after seeing that the populace of Palermo was showing sympathy to Constance, suggested that Tancred put Constance to death. Tancred disagreed, worrying that this would harm his popularity. So at the suggestion of Tancred, Sibylla discussed with Matthew of Ajello (who had been promoted to chancellor) where to imprison Constance. Matthew wrote a letter to Tancred in her presence, suggesting he put Constance in the Castel dell'Ovo in Naples in the custody of nobleman Aligerno Cottone. There she would be better-guarded since the castle was surrounded by water, and also secluded from the Sicilian people. Tancred accepted their suggestion. In addition, Matthew wrote to Aligerno, ordering "ut imperatricem in Castro Salvatoris ad mare bene custodiat" ("that he guard well the Empress in the Castle of the Savior by the sea", i.e., Castel dell'Ovo).

Although Tancred always treated her with courtesy during her captivity, Constance was under extremely careful guard. Sibylla strongly opposed the deference Tancred showed to Constance, believing this would implicitly acknowledge the claims of the latter.

During the election of a new bishop of Liege in September 1191, Henry favored Albert de Rethel, a maternal uncle of Constance, whom both he and Constance had planned to make the next bishop of Liege. However, as mentioned above, at the time of the election, Constance had been imprisoned by the Sicilians, and the other candidate, Albert of Louvain, gained more support. In January 1192 Henry claimed the election was under dispute and instead appointed his newly made imperial chancellor Lothar of Hochstaden, provost of the church of St Cassius in Bonn and brother of Count Dietrich of Hochstaden. In September 1192 he proceeded to Lüttich (Liège) to enforce the succession. The majority of the electors of Liège accepted the imperial decision because of the emperor's threat, and Albert de Rethel also relinquished his claim and indignantly refused a financial settlement from the emperor.

Margaritus was created Count of Malta in 1192 perhaps for his unexpected success of capturing the empress, granting him considerable resources.

Henry VI consistently refused to make peace with Tancred despite the capture of his wife; in his letter to Pope Celestine III to request the kingship of Tancred declared illegitimate, he even did not mention her captivity. While he did not have the power to rescue her, Tancred would not permit Constance to be ransomed unless Henry recognized him. Henry complained to Celestine about the capture of his wife, so the Pope threatened to excommunicate Tancred if he did not release the Empress. (The Pope hoped that by securing Constance's safe passage back to Rome Henry would be better disposed towards the papacy and Celestine would be able to keep the Empire and Sicily from uniting.) Finally, Tancred was willing to give up his negotiating advantage (i.e. possession of the Empress) if the Pope would legitimize him as King of Sicily.

Constance was released in 1192 with all her suites and some gifts, and delivered to Egidio Cardinal of Anagni from the Papal States. They traveled through the Strait of Messina, but before they made it to Rome they met imperial soldiers and the pro-Hohenstaufen abbot Roffredo of Montecassino, and Constance asked them for help; they were able to intercept the convoy at Ceprano despite the opposition of the cardinals and escorted her safely across the Alps, ensuring that in the end neither the papacy nor Sicily scored any real advantage in having had the Empress in their custody at all, only less than a month after her release; Within two weeks Henry and Constance reunited in the imperial castle of Trifels.

=== Second Expedition ===
Henry was already preparing to invade Sicily a second time when Tancred died in February 1194. Later that year he moved south, leveled Salerno to the ground in revenge for arresting Constance, entered Palermo unopposed, deposed Tancred's young son William III (died 1198), and had himself crowned instead. Prior to that he agreed the request of Constance to enfeoff William with the County of Lecce and Principality of Taranto on November 20.

== Queen of Sicily ==
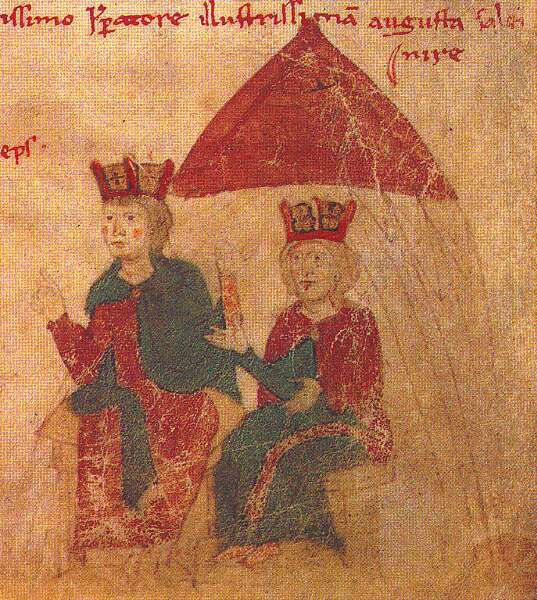
Constance and Henry, from the Liber ad honorem Augusti of Petrus of Ebulo, 1196

While Henry moved quickly south with his army, a pregnant Constance followed at a slower pace. On 26 December, the day after Henry was crowned at Palermo, she gave birth to a son, named Constantine after herself (later renamed Frederick-Roger, i. e. the future Frederick II, Holy Roman Emperor and King of Sicily) in the small town of Iesi, near Ancona.

Later, Frederick's opponents, using Constance's age (she was 40 at the time of Frederick's birth) as the basis, spread the rumours that he was the son of a butcher. This induced counter-legends, such as a story recorded by a 1282 Florentine chronicle (authored by Ricordano Malispini, according to which, Constance gave birth publicly in the town square (of Palermo, erroneously attributed as Frederick's birthplace by Malispini) to dispel doubt of her maternity. She had the baby in a pavilion tent in the market square of the town, and invited the town matrons to witness the birth. A few days later she returned to the town square and publicly breast-fed the infant.

When Henry returned to Germany in 1195, Constance ruled Sicily and issued diplomas in her own name. She was crowned as queen regnant on 2 April at Bari.

She was able to lead her own government, although certainly Henry's policies and the personnel he left placed some restriction on her independence. Many notaries who had worked for William II and Tancred, such as Gosfridus de Fogia, now worked for Constance, who based her government in Palermo and was surrounded by local noble families. Her government stopped to function after Henry's return, only to continue again after his death.

In 1196 Henry VI had Richard, Count of Acerra brother of Sibylla hanged in revenge for the capture of Constance.

On Good Friday in 1196, Constance summoned Joachim of Fiore to Palermo to hear her confession in the Palatine chapel. Initially she sat on a raised chair, but when Joachim told her that as they were at the places of Christ and Mary Magdalene, she needed to lower herself, she sat on the ground.

The establishment of Henry's rule in Sicily came with great social upheavals, including revolts around Catania and southern Sicily. Henry wanted to placate Sicilians by naming Constance regent. A part of the society, especially the elites who lost power during the transition, rejected German power and ethnic character as possessing a barbarous nature that could not be reasoned with. This group viewed Constance merely as Henry's tool, that could not stop him from making up Sicilian government dominated by German seneschal Markward von Anweiler and ensured by German troops. A work now known as "A Letter Concerning the Sicilian Tragedy to Peter" (which was written after William II's death in 1189 and before Henry's successful subjugation of Sicily) accused Constance, a Sicilian princess born and raised in Sicily, of helping to impose German barbarity on her homeland. Nevertheless, according to Philippa Byrne, there were also writers and administrators who were receptive to Henry and Constance's claims and their efforts to link themselves to the Hauteville tradition.

In 1197 Henry revisited Sicily, when there was a plot to murder him. Henry crushed the rebellion of Jordan Lupin who claimed to be king of Sicily and supposedly received a gift of jewels from Constance. According to German sources hostile to Constance, Constance also joined the revolts against her husband. Apparently, Henry did not act against Constance (other than the fact he had Jordan tortured to death in front of Constance in June 1197) despite reports of her complicity. They continued to live together and issue joint diplomas. On 28 September of that year, Henry died, likely from malaria. Constance was at his death bed and suspected by some of poisoning him (a theory that was criticized by other contemporaries). Theo Kölzer remarks that by this time, their marriage was at a low point. It is possible that the empress felt the mood of her compatriots and passively tolerated the rebels, but the evidence does not conclusively demonstrate that she actively participated in the conspiracies.

== Crowning of Frederick II and her death ==
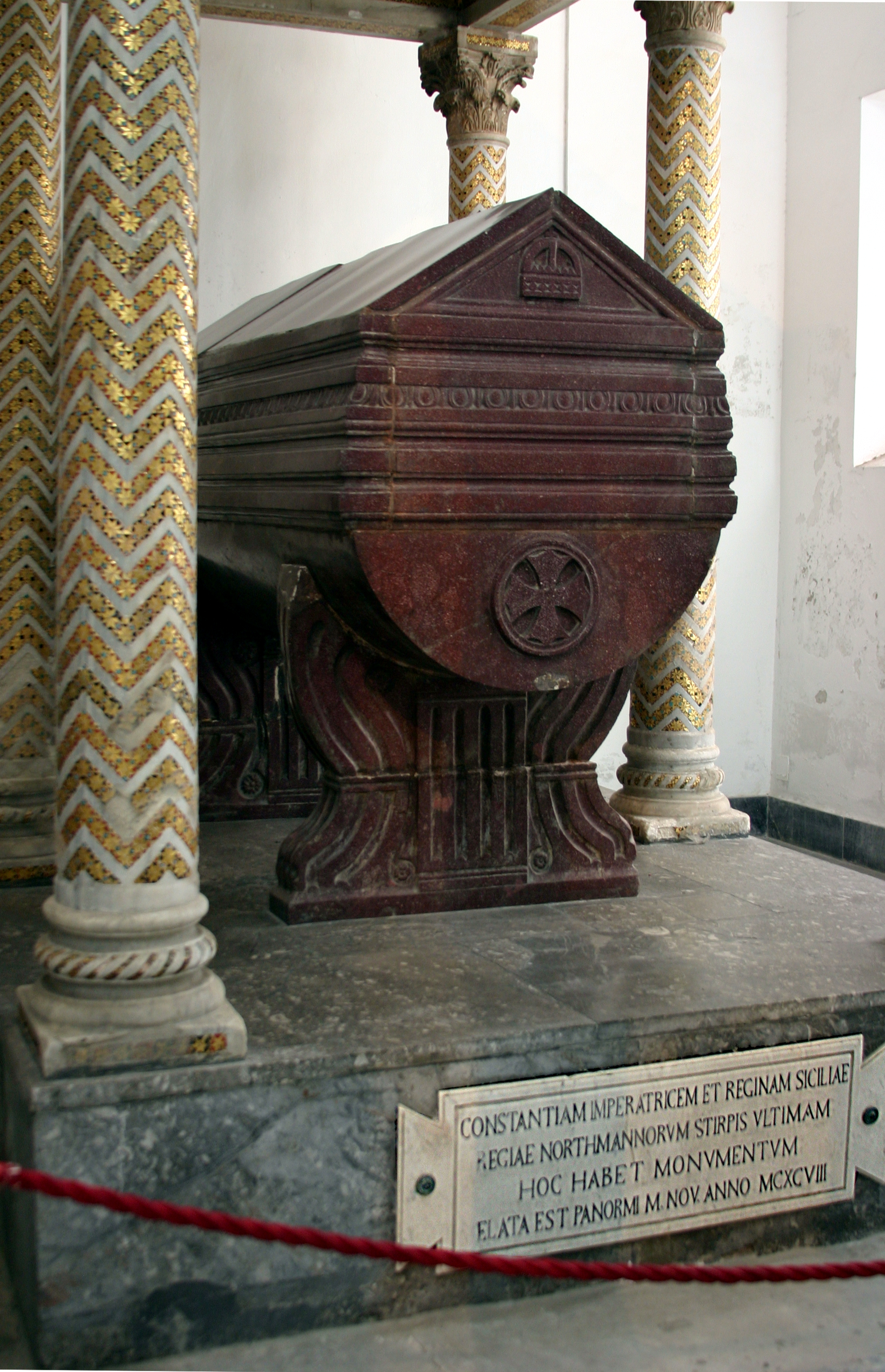
Constance's tomb, in the Cathedral of Palermo.

In May 1198, Constance had the three-year-old Frederick crowned King of Sicily with herself as regent. After Henry's death, initially she had upheld for her son the double title Romanorum et Sicilie Rex, but she abandoned the German claim after the coronation of Frederick in Palermo, May 1198. According to Kölzer, the Pope had put pressure on Constance and Frederick to abandon the title. Additionally, the death of Henry had left in Germany a power vacuum that a child monarch could not fill. Constance likely realized that Frederick's perspective in Germany was hopeless and supported the claims of her brother-in-law Philip of Swabia, who was supported by a number of the princes against the Welf candidate, Otto IV.

Her government displayed a full swing towards the Norman tradition (and rejection of Henry's vision of imperial rule) after her husband's death. She surrounded herself with local advisors and excluded the ambitious Markward von Anweiler from a position of power, attempting to restrict him to his fief in Molise, as well as Walter of Palearia and Conrad I, Duke of Spoleto. While her own health becoming poor, Constance made warm overtures to the new pope Innocent III, abandoning the long-contended principle that the king was the apostolic legate, a central principle of Norman autonomy in the regno (when Henry was still alive, she had not hesitated to defend her rights as the natural heiress of her Norman forefathers, even against the authority of the Pope). Faced with the dangers that surrounded any child-king, Constance placed Frederick under the protection of Pope Innocent III, who forced her to cede traditional royal rights over church councils, legates, appeals and elections, leaving her only the right to approve a bishop-elect before he could occupy his see.

She issued diplomas jointly with Frederick after his coronation. Constance maintained her title of Holy Roman Empress Dowager, but she tried to keep options open for her son: she accepted the Pope's conditions only as Queen of Sicily and not Empress – her husband had refused to accepted Sicily as a fief from the Pope all his life, to maintain the dignity of the Empire. That he became much more than King of Sicily could not be predicted when she unexpectedly died in late November 1198, before the cardinal sent by the Pope to receive her homage arrived. In her will she set up a Council of Regency for Sicily and made Innocent, who was the child's feudal suzerain, his guardian, a reminder to all of the inviolability of his inheritance. She also instructed her subjects to swear fidelity to the Pope.

Constance was buried in the Cathedral of Palermo near the tombs of her father and her husband (and later their son). Her death led to a period of violence and chaos till 1208 when Frederick had grown to his majority. According to historian Josef Deér, the tomb that now holds the remains of Constance was actually the one she had commissioned for her husband. In 1215, Frederick had his father reburied in a porphyry sarcophagus taken from Cefalù (which was one of the two sarcophagi Roger II had commissioned for himself; according to the emperor's order, the other one was reserved for himself).

== Views on Constance ==
Historian Vinicius Dreger writes that Constance was probably "maybe the most important woman of Western Europe in late twelfth century", yet "about her, as on most of her predecessors and contemporaries, we know little."

Biographer Jacqueline Alio infers that Constance and her sister-in-law Queen Dowager Margaret of Navarre knew each other and in her youth she might have intimated the style of leadership of Margaret, so they might have shared a sisterhood if tenuous. (Whether out of the will of Margaret or not, Constance was not released from her monastery during the lifetime of Margaret, who died in 1183.)

In the Divine Comedy, Dante places Constance in Paradise (though he subscribed to the story that Constance had been a nun):

"This other radiance that shows itself
to you at my right hand, a brightness kindled
by all the light that fills our heaven - she

has understood what I have said: she was
a sister, and from her head, too, by force,
the shadow of the sacred veil was taken.

But though she had been turned back to the world
against her will, against all honest practice,
the veil upon her heart was never loosed.

This is the splendor of the great Costanza,
who from the Swabians' second gust engendered
the one who was their third and final power."

— Divine Comedy, Paradiso, Canto III, lines 109-120, Mandelbaum translation

Constance had arranged the marriage between her son and a princess of Aragon, which would occur in 1209.

== Film and media ==
Constance is present in a scene in the film about Joachim of Fiore "Joachim and the Apocalypse" by Jordan River. Playing Constance the Italian actress Elisabetta Pellini.

== Controversial accounts ==
De Mulieribus Claris (Latin for "Concerning Famous Women") said that Constance was a daughter of King William I of Sicily, and upon her birth a Calabrian abbot named Joachim told William that his daughter would cause the destruction of Sicily. William believed the prediction and shut young Constance up in a monastery and forced her to become a nun to prevent her having husband or children. When permitted to be betrothed to Henry she continuously objected for that she thought her advancing age would become an obstacle, but in vain, "Thus did a wrinkled crone abandon the sacred cloister, discard her monastic veil, and, royally adorned, marry and emerge in public as empress". This apparently contradicted the facts that Constance was indeed the posthumous daughter of Roger II and half-sister of William and she became empress in 1192. Giovanni Villani said William I sought to put her to death due to the prediction until Tancred a bastard son of Roger I, Count of Sicily persuaded him to send her to a convent.

Some said that it was Roger II who put Constance in a convent, which contradicted the fact that Constance was born after the death of Roger II.

Joachim Camerarius argued that Constance was simply sent to the convent during the coup against William I for her safety and stayed there until her betrothal without ever being a nun. Hugo Falcandus and Richard of San Germano argued Constance was brought up and educated in royal palace rather than a monastery. François Eudes de Mézeray said Constance had never become a nun.

Malespini and Boccaccio said she married at 50 and 55 respectively, and Brantôme argued that she married at 50 and gave birth at 52, while none was true. Florentine chroniclers said that Tancred annoyed the Pope so he and Archbishop of Palermo arranged the marriage of Constance to dethrone Tancred, and Tommaso Fazello said that according to decrees Celestine III absolved her from her vows, which contradicted the fact that Constance was betrothed during the reign of William II who would reign the next five years and Celestine was elected 7 years later; the chroniclers also said that it was wicked for the Pope to force Constance to give in her vows to marry, so Papal States was punished by the Heaven as the son born of the marriage of Constance would become its thorn.

An anonymous Vatican said in his Historia Sicula that the reason Constance did not marry before 30 was that she was too ugly, which could not be taken seriously, as political marriages seldom considered the looks of the parties.

== See also ==
- Hauteville family
- History of Swabian Sicily

== Primary sources ==
- Giovanni Villani, Cronica, V.20, VI.16, VII.1

== Secondary sources ==
- David Abulafia, Frederick II, a Medieval Emperor, 1988 (Oxford University press)
- Jacqueline Alio, Queens of Sicily 1061-1266, 2018. ISBN 978-1-943-63914-4
- Walter Fröhlich, "The Marriage of Henry VI and Constance of Sicily: Prelude and Consequences", Anglo-Norman Studies XV, 1992
- Donald Matthew, The Norman Kingdom of Sicily, ISBN 0-521-26911-3
- John Julius Norwich, The Kingdom in the Sun, reprinted as part of his The Normans in Sicily, ISBN 0-14-015212-1
- Costanza, sacred opera performance at Our Lady of Mt. Carmel Church, Bronx, NY on 26 October 2008. John Marino, distinguished composer conductor, arranger, pianist, coordinated the performance. The libretto was written by Florence Bocarius.
- Mary Taylor Simeti, Travels with a Medieval Queen, 2001. ISBN 978-0-374-27878-6.

Regnal titles
Preceded by William III	Queen of Sicily; 1194–1198 with Henry (1194–1197); Frederick II (1198)	Succeeded by Frederick II
German royalty
Preceded by Beatrice of Burgundy	Queen consort of Germany; 1186–1196	Succeeded by Irene Angelina
Preceded by Beatrice of Burgundy	Empress consort of the Holy Roman Empire; 1191–1197	Vacant Title next held by Beatrice of Hohenstaufen
