= William III of Sicily =

King of Sicily in 1194

William III
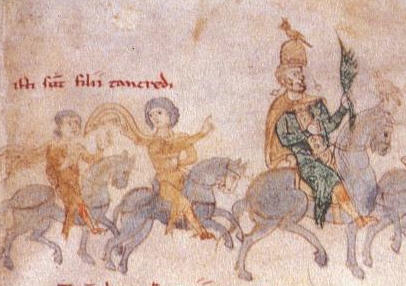
- A near-contemporary depiction of William (far left) with his father Tancred (far right) and brother Roger (middle).

King of Sicily
- Reign: February – October 1194
- Coronation: January/February 1194
- Predecessor: Tancred
- Successor: Constance & Henry I
- Born: c. 1186; Palermo, Kingdom of Sicily
- Died: c. 1198; Alt-Ems, Swabia, Holy Roman Empire
- House: House of Hauteville
- Father: Tancred, King of Sicily
- Mother: Sibylla of Acerra

William III (Italian: Guglielmo; c. 1186 – c. 1198), a scion of the Hauteville dynasty, was the last Norman king of Sicily, who reigned briefly for ten months in 1194. He was overthrown by his great-aunt Constance I and her husband, Emperor Henry VI.

== Life and reign ==
William was the second son of Count Tancred of Lecce and Sibylla of Acerra. When in 1189 King William II of Sicily died childless, Tancred, an illegitimate cousin, gained the support of Pope Clement III to be crowned king of Sicily, denying the right of his and William's aunt Constance, legitimate daughter of King Roger II.

At the age of four, shortly after the death of his older brother Roger, William was crowned co-king in Palermo. His father died on 20 February 1194, while his mother, Queen Sibylla, ruled as regent.

Constance and her husband, Emperor Henry VI, laid claim to the throne of Sicily. Even before Tancred's death, Henry had been planning to invade, and his resources had been further augmented by the ransom he had received for the release of King Richard I of England.

== Overthrow and death ==
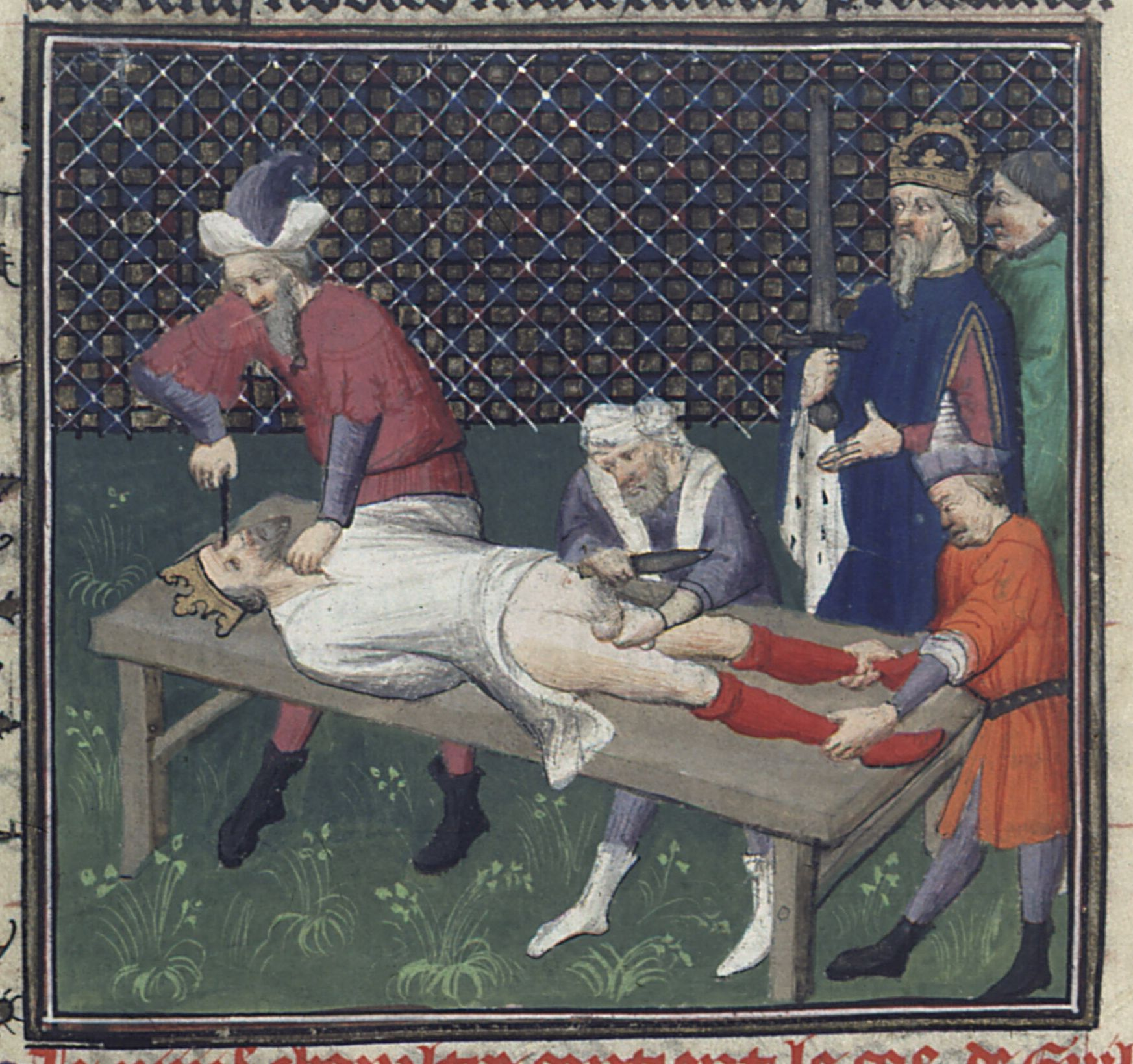
The torture of William III of Sicily, Giovanni Boccaccio: De Casibus Virorum Illustrium, 15th century ed. Note that William III was no older than seven years of age when this supposedly happened.

In August 1194 Henry marched against Sicily. Sibylla was unable to organize much effective resistance. By the end of October Henry had conquered all the mainland parts of the kingdom and crossed over into the island of Sicily. On 20 November Palermo fell, William and his mother fled to Caltabellotta Castle.

Henry offered Sibylla generous terms: William was to retain the County of Lecce, the home territory of his father before he had become king, and was also to retain the Principality of Taranto in turn for renouncing the royal crown. With that agreement reached, William, his mother and his sisters watched while Henry was crowned King of Sicily on 25 December. Nevertheless, four days later, an alleged conspiracy against the new king was uncovered, and many of the leading Italo-Norman political figures were arrested and sent to prison in Germany, including William and his family.

While his mother and sisters were eventually released and lived in obscurity in France, nothing is known for certain of William's subsequent fate. He is said to have been blinded and castrated, on orders of Henry. (Note: Edward Wheatley states this was recorded in English and Italian sources.) According to some sources he died in captivity at Hohenems Castle a few years later. (Note: Stefan Burkhardt and Thomas Foerster state William was imprisoned at Hohenem Castle, but do not state he died there.) Another theory is that he later returned to Sicily under the alias Tancredi Palamara. Henry's son, Emperor Frederick II (who was also king of Sicily) discovered Tancredi Palamara in Messina and had him executed in 1232. However, referring to several letters by Pope Celestine III, the date generally accepted for his death is 1198. William's heir was his younger sister, Elvira.

== Sources ==
- Barber, Malcolm, ed. (2003). The History of the Holy War: Ambroise's Estoire de la Guerre Sainte. Vol. 1. Translated by Ailes, Marianne. The Boydell Press.
- Burkhardt, Stefan; Foerster, Thomas, eds. (2016). Norman Tradition and Transcultural Heritage: Exchange of Cultures in the 'Norman' Peripheries of Medieval Europe. Routledge.
- Diehl, Peter D. (2016). "Henry VI, Heresy and the Extensionb of Imperial Power in Italy". In Figueira, Robert Charles (ed.). Plenitude of Power: The Doctrines and Exercise of Authority in the Middle Ages: Essays in Memory of Robert Louis Benson. Taylor & Francis.
- Houben, Hubert (2002). Roger II of Sicily: A Ruler Between East and West. Cambridge University Press.
- Poole, Austin Lane (1926). "The Emperor Henry VI". In Tanner, J.R.; Previte-Orton, C.W.; Brooke, Z.N. (eds.). The Cambridge Medieval History. Vol. V: Contest of Empire and Papacy. The Macmillan Company.
- Powell, James M., ed. (2004). The Deeds of Pope Innocent III. Catholic University of America Press.
- Robinson, I. S. (1990). The Papacy, 1073-1198: Continuity and Innovation. Cambridge University Press.
- Venning, Timothy, ed. (2006). A Chronology of the Byzantine Empire. Palgrave Macmillan.
- Wheatley, Edward (2022). Stumbling Blocks Before the Blind: Medieval Constructions of a Disability. University of Michigan Press.

William III of Sicily House of Hauteville Born: c. 1186 Died: c. 1198
Regnal titles
Preceded by Tancred	King of Sicily; 1194	Succeeded by Henry I Constance
