= Roger III of Sicily =

King of Sicily, 1192–1193

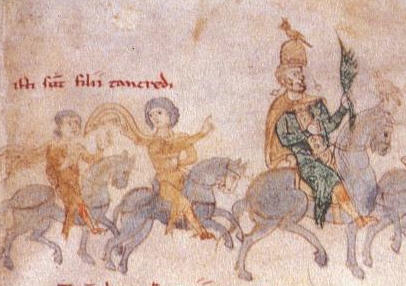
A near-contemporary depiction of Roger (center) with his father Tancred (right) and brother William (left)

Roger III (Italian: Ruggero III, Sicilian: Ruggeru III; 1175 – 24 December 1193), of the House of Hauteville, was the eldest son and heir of King Tancred of Sicily and Queen Sibylla. He was made Duke of Apulia (as Roger V), probably in 1189, shortly after his father's accession. In the summer of 1192 he was crowned co-king with his father. Follari were minted at Messina bearing both Tancred's and Roger's names as kings.

In 1193, Tancred arranged for Roger to marry Irene Angelina, daughter of the Byzantine emperor Isaac II Angelos. Roger died on 24 December 1193, however, upsetting his father's plans. Tancred quickly had Roger's younger brother, William III, crowned as co-king, but Tancred himself died on 20 February 1194. On 20 November 1194, Holy Roman Emperor Henry VI entered Palermo and William was deposed on 25 December. In 1197 Roger's widow, Irene, married Henry VI's brother, Duke Philip of Swabia.
