= Tancred of Sicily =

King of Sicily from 1189 to 1194

Tancred
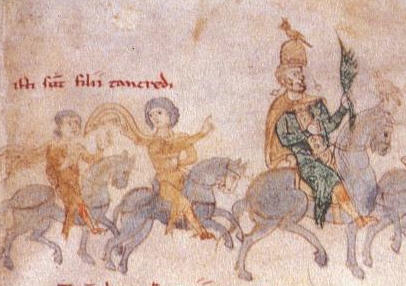
- 13th century depiction of Tancred (right) with his sons Roger (center) and William (left)

King of Sicily
- Reign: 1189 – 20 February 1194
- Predecessor: William II
- Successor: William III
- Born: 1138; Lecce (Apulia), Kingdom of Sicily
- Died: 20 February 1194 (aged 55–56)
- Burial: La Magione, Palermo
- Spouse: Sibylla of Acerra
- Issue: Roger III of Sicily; William III of Sicily; Elvira; Constance; Valdrada
- House: Hauteville
- Father: Roger III, Duke of Apulia
- Mother: Emma of Lecce

Tancred (Italian: Tancredi; 1138 – 20 February 1194) was King of Sicily from 1189 to 1194. He was born in Lecce, an illegitimate son of Roger III, Duke of Apulia (the eldest son of King Roger II) by his mistress Emma, a daughter of Achard II, Count of Lecce. He is often referred to as Tancred of Lecce because by the reign of William II he had become count of Lecce and lord of a wide cluster of dominions in southern Apulia, sometimes also described in the sources as the "principality of Taranto". Recent scholarship has stressed that, long before he seized the throne, Tancred was already one of the most prominent nobles in southern Apulia, closely tied to the royal court and active in the government of the mainland provinces. Due to his short stature and unhandsome visage, he was mocked by his critics as "The Monkey King".

== Early career ==
After the death of Duke Roger, to prevent any future trouble, King Roger II kept Tancred and his younger brother William in close custody in Palermo.

On 9 March 1161, Tancred joined his uncle Simon, Prince of Taranto, in invading the palace, detained the king and queen, William I and Margaret, and their two sons, and incited a massacre of Muslims. Originally, the older of these two sons, Roger IV, Duke of Apulia, was destined to be crowned in place of William, but soon the populace supported the accession of Simon himself. Before Simon could put himself forward as a candidate, however, the rebellion had broken down and the people were restless. The insurrectionists were forced to free the king and retreat to their castles. Pardon was given them on condition of exile and many, including Tancred, took the offer. Tancred was exiled to Constantinople and returned to Sicily in 1166 upon the accession of the new king, his cousin William II.

Before the end of 1168, Tancred had been granted the former county of Montescaglioso. From this basis there developed the county of Lecce, which absorbed Montescaglioso while also extending across the Salento. In this context, the so-called principality of Taranto attached to Tancred was not a separate judicial or administrative province, but rather a territorial designation for the southern Apulian dominions associated with his lordship. By the 1170s and 1180s he is documented not only as a territorial lord but also as a royal functionary. He founded the church and monastery of Saints Nicholas and Cataldo at Lecce in 1180, made further donations there in 1182 and 1185, and appears in other acts as count of Lecce and lord of Ostuni.

In royal service, Tancred also acted as magnus comestabulus and magister iustitiarius of Apulia and the Terra di Lavoro. In the early 1180s he presided over or coordinated provincial courts in Bari, Barletta, and elsewhere, receiving royal orders, convening proceedings, and overseeing investigations and enforcement. These activities show that he was deeply embedded in the mainland government of the kingdom before his accession in 1189.

In 1174, a large fleet, led by Tancred on behalf of William II, sailed to Egypt and briefly besieged the city of Alexandria. The Sicilians realised that their expected allies would not be coming (due to King Amalric I of Jerusalem's death) and with Saladin's army approaching they returned to their ships and sailed home.

As William II was heirless, Tancred had a chance to claim the throne; to prevent this, in October 1184 William released his aunt Constance from monastery, approved her marriage and designated her as his heir.

In June 1185, Tancred led a huge Sicilian fleet of 300 ships under the command of Richard, Count of Acerra his brother-in-law to Durazzo to attack the core of the Byzantine Empire. In August, surrounded by navy and army, Thessaloniki was occupied and looted. The Sicilian army was then heavily damaged by the army of the Byzantine emperor Isaac II and was annihilated on the way back to the Balkans, while the fleet of Tancred returned to Sicily unharmed.

In June 1186, Tancred and Margaritus of Brindisi led the Norman fleet to Cyprus, whose Byzantine governor, Isaac Comnenus, had rebelled against Isaac II. They swiftly defeated the expeditionary force which Isaac II had sent against the rebels, capturing 70 warships. Margaritus was later made Count of Zakynthos, Cephalonia, and Ithaki.

Tancred was the governor of Lecce, where he built the Church of St. Nicholas in Catado (1180), the St. Maria church complex near Squinzano and the important works in Otranto Cathedral.

== Kingship ==
=== Accession ===
Despite having sworn fealty to Constance, as soon as William II died, in 1189, Tancred rebelled and seized control of the island. He was crowned early in 1190. His coup was backed by the vice chancellor Matthew d'Ajello and the official class, while the rival claims of Constance and her husband, Henry VI, King of the Romans, were supported by most of the nobles. Tancred's bid for the throne was strengthened by the substantial mainland power base he already possessed in southern Apulia. His county of Lecce and the dominions grouped under the label of the principality of Taranto gave him a territorial platform and political following more solid than that of a mere court faction leader. Roger, Count of Andria, also a candidate for Sicilian throne, was among the supporters of Constance and Henry. Matthew d'Ajello managed to defame Roger, and in the same year Richard, Count of Acerra brother-in-law of Tancred tricked Roger into captivity and execution. Matthew also persuaded Pope Clement III to support Tancred, and Tancred appointed Matthew as chancellor.

=== Treaty with Richard ===
Tancred was a good soldier, though his tiny stature earned him the nickname "Tancredulus" from the poet chronicler Peter of Eboli. Despite a measure of popular support, his rule faced daunting challenges right from the start.

In 1190, King Richard I of England arrived in Sicily at the head of a large crusading army on its way to the Holy Land. Richard immediately demanded the release of his sister, William II's wife Joan, imprisoned by Tancred in 1189, along with every penny of her dowry and dower (in response of her vocal support of Germans). He also insisted that Tancred fulfil the financial commitments made by William II to the crusade. When Tancred balked at these demands, Richard seized a monastery and the castle of La Bagnara.

Richard was joined in Sicily by the French crusading army, led by King Philip II. The presence of two foreign armies soon caused unrest among the locals. In October the people of Messina revolted, demanding that the foreigners leave the island. Richard responded by attacking Messina, which he captured on 4 October 1190. After the city had been looted and burned, Richard established his base there and decided to stay the winter.

Richard remained at Messina until March 1191, when Tancred finally agreed to a treaty. According to the treaty's main terms:

- Joan was to be released, receiving her dower along with the dowry.
- Richard and Philip recognised Tancred as King of Sicily and vowed to keep the peace among all three of their kingdoms.
- Richard officially proclaimed his nephew Arthur of Brittany as his heir presumptive, and Tancred promised to marry one of his daughters to Arthur when he came of age (Arthur was four years old at the time).

After signing the treaty Richard and Philip finally left Sicily for the Holy Land. It is rumoured that before he left, Richard gave Tancred a sword he claimed was Excalibur in order to secure their friendship.

=== Contention with Constance ===
Having at last rid himself of the crusaders, Tancred next confronted the threat from the north. In April 1191 in Rome, Henry and Constance were crowned emperor and empress of the Holy Roman Empire by Pope Celestine III, and now the pair turned south to claim the Kingdom of Sicily. Constance accompanied her husband at the head of a substantial imperial army that descended into the Regno. The northern towns of the kingdom opened their gates to Henry, including the earliest Norman strongholds Capua and Aversa. Salerno, once Roger II's mainland capital, sent word ahead that Henry was welcome and invited Constance to stay in her father's old palace to escape the summer heat. Naples offered the first resistance of the whole campaign, withstanding a siege with the help of Margaritus of Brindisi's fleet, until much of the imperial army had succumbed to malaria and disease. Eventually the imperial army was forced to withdraw from the kingdom altogether. Constance remained in Salerno with a small garrison, as a sign that Henry would soon return.

Once Henry had withdrawn with the bulk of the imperial army, the towns that had supposedly fallen to the empire immediately declared their allegiance to Tancred, for the most part now fearing his retribution. The populace of Salerno saw an opportunity to win some favour with Tancred and delivered Constance to him in Messina, an important prize given that Henry had every intention of returning. Tancred angrily blamed Constance for German invasion, but Constance, in her attire as empress, replied that she was taking back her dominion grabbed by Tancred. Despite this Tancred always treated his aunt, now detained, honourably with courtesy, which his wife Queen Sibylla strongly opposed, believing this would implicitly acknowledge the claim of the latter. Constance was sent to Palermo supervised by Sibylla, eating with her and sleeping in her bedroom. Sibylla suggested that Constance be put to death after sensing that the citizens of Palermo seemed to sympathize with her or view her as the legal heiress of Sicily, but Tancred did not agree, worrying that this would harm his popularity; instead, he suggested Sibylla to consult with Matthew d'Ajello, and after receiving a letter written by Matthew d'Ajello in presence of Sibylla, he had Constance locked in Castel dell'Ovo in Naples to be better-guarded. With the empress in his hand Tancred initially wanted to force Henry into a cease-fire and would not permit her to be ransomed unless Henry recognized him. In 1192 he created Margaritus Count of Malta, perhaps for his unexpected success in capturing the empress. However, Tancred was willing to give up his negotiation advantage, that is, his aunt, in exchange for Pope Celestine III legitimizing him as King of Sicily. In turn, the Pope was hoping that by securing Constance's safe passage back to Rome, Henry would be better disposed towards the papacy, and he was still hoping to keep the empire and the kingdom from uniting. Under the Pope's threat of excommunication, Tancred was forced to do so and gave Constance gifts. However, imperial soldiers were able to intervene at the borders of the Papal States before Constance made it to Rome; and they returned her safely across the Alps in summer 1192. So both Tancred and Pope effectively gained nothing from the captivity of the Empress.

Henry had left garrisons along the frontiers of the Regno. Tancred now sought to win over the towns by extensive grants of privileges. At Gravina (June 1192) he reinforced his papal support by surrendering the royal legateship over Sicily. In 1192 and 1193 he personally led successful campaigns against the Apulian barons. But his death at Palermo (20 February 1194) two months after that of his young son and co-king, Roger III, opened the way for Hohenstaufen rule in Sicily.

His widow, Sibylla of Acerra, a member of the d'Aquino family, established a regency for their son, William III, but Henry returned to Italy later that year with his army financed by the lucrative ransom of Richard I. Naples surrendered in May, almost without a blow, and the rest of the Regno followed. Sibylla and the loyal Margaritus prepared to defend Palermo, but the citizens admitted the Emperor on 20 November 1194. Tancred's family fell into Henry's hands, and William III, rumoured castrated and blinded, seemed to have died in Germany in 1198. Henry also had the body of Tancred pulled out of his grave.

== Family ==
Tancred's children with Sibylla of Acerra were:

- Roger III, duke of Apulia and king of Sicily
- William III, duke of Apulia and king of Sicily
- Elvira, countess of Lecce after the death of her brother; married firstly Walter III of Brienne, secondly Giacomo Sanseverino, Count of Tricario, and thirdly Tigrini Guidi, Count of Modigliano (or Count Palatine in Tuscany?)
- Constance, married Pietro Ziani, later Doge of Venice
- Medania
- Valdrada, married Giacomo Tello, later Doge of Venice

== Notes ==
Regnal titles
Preceded by William II	King of Sicily; 1189–1194 with Roger III	Succeeded by William III
Preceded by Geoffrey III	Count of Lecce; 1181–1194	Succeeded by William III
