= Maria of Brabant, Duchess of Bavaria =

Maria of Brabant
- Duchess of Bavaria
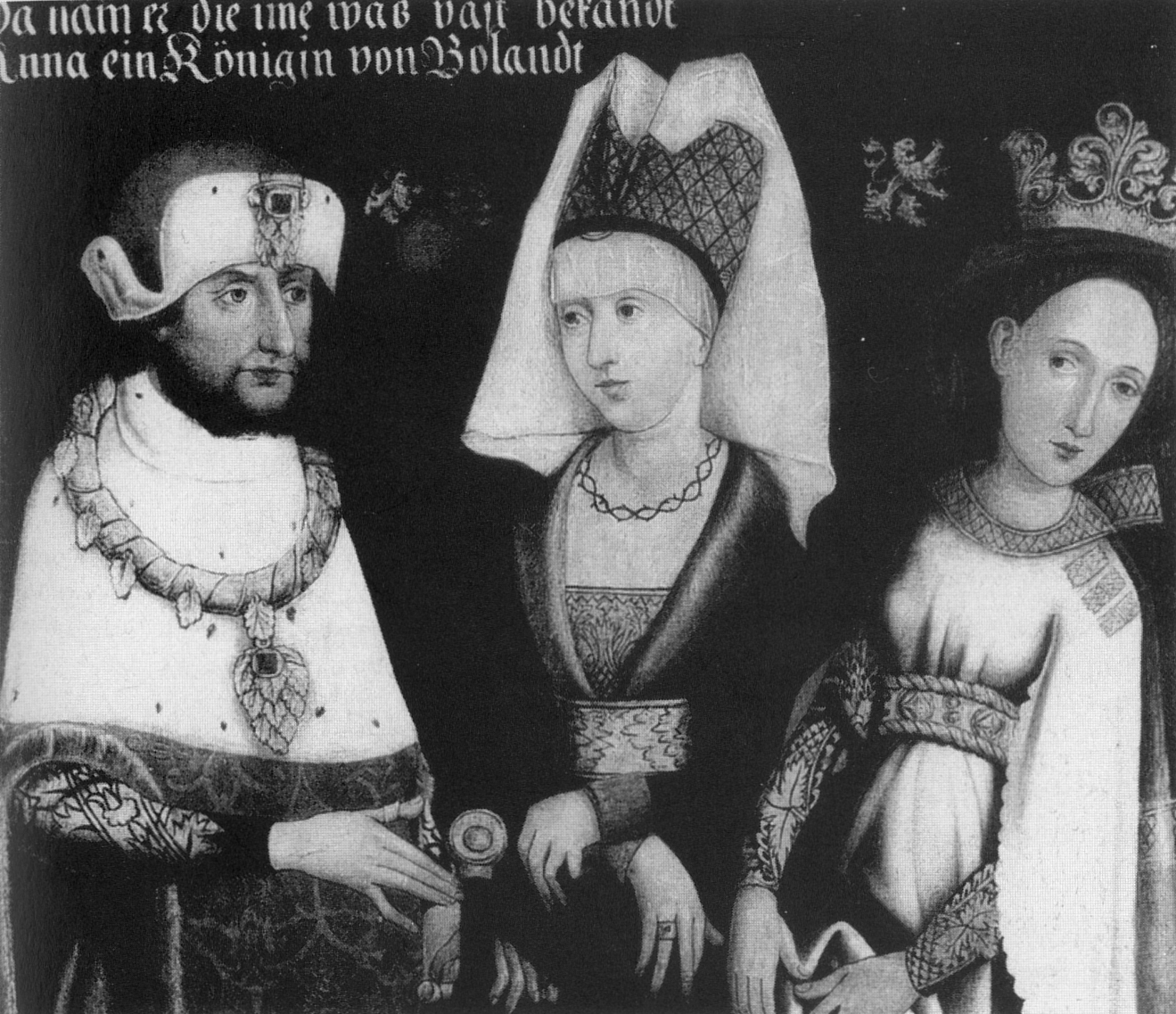
- Maria (centre), with her husband Louis (left) and his second wife, Anna of Glogau (right).
- Born: 1226
- Died: 1256 (aged 29–30)
- Spouse: Louis II, Duke of Bavaria (m. 1254)
- House: Reginar
- Father: Henry II, Duke of Brabant
- Mother: Maria of Swabia

Maria of Brabant (1226–1256) was a daughter of Henry II, Duke of Brabant, and Maria of Swabia. She married Louis II, Duke of Bavaria, being the first of three wives. In 1256 she was executed for adultery.

== Background ==
Maria was the daughter of Duke Henry II of Brabant and Lorraine from his first marriage to Maria of Swabia, daughter of King Philip of Swabia. The younger Maria's siblings included Henry III, Duke of Brabant and Matilda of Brabant. After her mother's death her father married Sophie of Thuringia; from this marriage she gained two half-siblings, including Henry I of Hesse.

== Betrothals and marriage ==
On 2 August 1254, Maria married Louis II, Duke of Bavaria. The couple were married for only two years, during which time they had no children.

== Execution ==
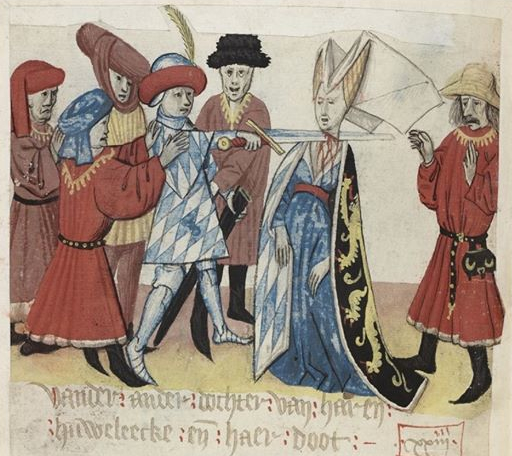
Execution of Maria as depicted by Jan van Boendale

Maria was executed by beheading in Donauwörth in 1256 after having been accused of adultery by her husband. It was later determined that Louis had not proven his case, and in fact had not presented any valid evidence of adultery; as penance, he founded the Cistercian friary Fürstenfeld Abbey (Fürstenfeldbruck) near Munich.

Different sources give varying accounts. According to the chronicle of Esiah Wilpacher, Louis was at war with the Prince-Bishopric of Augsburg. Maria's confessor, allegedly in league with the bishop, persuaded her to write her husband requesting he end the siege and return home. When this failed, she then wrote to one of his vassals, who being away from camp, Louis received the letter. Recognizing the handwriting, he read it and construed it as indicating she was having an affair.

Over time a great many tales of folklore sprang up around Louis' deed, most of them written long after his death: Ballad-mongers embellished the tale into a murderous frenzy during which Louis allegedly not only killed his wife after having ridden home for five days and nights, but also stabbed the messenger who brought him the wrong letter; then upon entering his castle, stabbed his own castellan and a court lady and threw his wife's maid from the battlements, before he massacred his wife either by stabbing her or cutting off her head. More restrained chronicles support the account of Maria's execution on 18 January 1256 at Mangoldstein Castle in Donauwörth by ducal decree for alleged adultery, but nothing beyond that.

Maria is said to be the basis for the legendary Genevieve of Brabant in Dutch folklore.

== Sources ==
- Bumke, Joachim (1991). Courtly Culture: Literature and Society in the High Middle Ages. Translated by Dunlap, Thomas. University of California Press.
- Dunbabin, Jean (2011). The French in the Kingdom of Sicily, 1266–1305. Cambridge University Press.
