= Brabant Road =

Ancient road in Germany

The Brabant Road (German: Brabanter Straße), Cologne to Leipzig Road (Köln-Leipziger Straße) or Liege Road (Lütticher Straße) is an ancient road which, during the Middle Ages and Early Modern Period, was one of the most important continental east-west oriented military and trade routes. It ran from the eponymous Duchy of Brabant to Leipzig.

== History ==
The road linked the two major north-south routes, the Rhine Road (Rheinstraße) on the eastern side of the Rhine valley and the Wine Road (Weinstraße), which ran along the western slopes of the Wetterau hills from Frankfurt northwards. (Note: The Hellweg, "the second largest route from the Rhine to the Vistula ran from Cologne via Magdeburg to Danzig. The medieval long-distance trading route followed the old Germanic Hellweg route from Duisburg via Dortmund, Paderborn, Hildesheim, Brunswick and Magdeburg, along which Drusus and his legions advanced to the Elbe. At the aforementioned places famous palaces (Pfalzen) and episcopal seats were established. After the conquest of the lower Vistula area by the Teutonic Order this east-west road from here via Frankfurt/Oder, Gnesen and Thorn was extended. Hans Hitzer (1971)) Even in prehistory and early history it could have been of importance. As a ridgeway (in places a high sunken road) the route avoided boggy valleys and river crossings and the bridge tolls raised at that time.

In the 16th century, a street was called Cologne Road (Kölner Straße), which dates back to the Franconian conquest and can be regarded as a guideline for the emergence of the two Hessian monasteries at Fulda and Hersfeld. After this phase, it played an important role in the attempt by the Salians to increase the imperial estates in the Harz and Saxony. Finally, the Hohenstaufen rulers wanted to make the Ringgau, with Boyneburg castle, an imperial state and relied on the support of the Thuringian landgraves, for which this road became just as important for the administration of the Mainz territories in Thuringia. Last but not least, it was sufficiently important to the Erfurt's lines of communication that it found its way into the Erfurter Meilenscheibe and the Interiarien of the 17th century.

Outside the cities, the road ran largely away from settlements along the longer east-western watershed on its ridge or parallel to the slope. Except in the cities and on bridges it was unpaved, it was a "natural road" and its condition was accordingly rudimentary. If the way was damaged by traffic, it was bypassed. This resulted in fan-like and meandering paths. Bad, unpaved roads were also a source of income for the respective lord of the manor, since, in accordance with customary law (de:Grundruhrrecht), all goods that touched the ground in the event of a broken wheel/axle, when a train animal fell or because of a bad route belonged to him. With the foundation of the Hanseatic League, the merchants tried to counteract this claim.

As early as 1255 it was called a strata publica (= "public road"). In 1265, Landgravine Sophie expressly charged the castellans (Burgmannen) of her castle at Blankenstein (Gladenbach) with the protection of this public road within their area of influence. The road connected the former Duchy of Brabant in today's Belgium with Leipzig, running via Cologne, Siegen, Angelburg, Marburg, Eisenach, Erfurt and Naumburg. This medieval street, which connected important trade fair sites, carried a large proportion of east-west trade, especially grain, textile products from Flemish and Lower German textile centres, woad from Thuringia, eastern European furs (the trading centre of which was Leipzig) as well as ironware from the northwestern Lahn-Dill region (Dietzhölzetal), the Siegerland, the Thuringian Forest. (Note: Eisen und Waffen: Suhl and Schmalkalden - were regarded as centres of medieval armament and weapons production alongside Nuremberg.) At times, the livestock trade (horses and cattle) was significant. A transport network for herrings and salted cod had already been established in the Hanseatic era. Hops and beer were also valued as profitable commodities. The procurement of special building blocks (sintered limestones for about 130 capitals at the palas) from the Eifel region is documented for the Wartburg in the 12th century. Armies, pilgrims and travellers used the road all year round.

Today, the Brabant Road is part of the "European Cultural Route VIA REGIA", which brings together the historic streets of the Brabant Raad, the Way of St James and the actual Via Regia.

== Sources ==
- Erfurter Geleitsordnung des Hartung Cammermeister 1441. In: Herbert Helbig (ed.): Quellen zur älteren Wirtschaftsgeschichte Mitteldeutschlands. Vol. II. Hermann Böhlaus Nachf., Weimar, 1952, No. 174, pp. 145–153. (Quellen zur mitteldeutschen Landes- und Volksgeschichte 2)
- Geleitsregelungen im Zeitzer Vertrag von 1567 (No. 133–140) zwischen den Kurfürsten und Herzog John William of Saxe-Weimar (1530–1573). In: Carl Friedrich Göschel: Chronik der Stadt Langensalza in Thüringen. Vol. II. Friedrich Spithen, Berlin, 1818. (Reprint: Rockstuhl, Bad Langensalza, 2007, ISBN 978-3-86777-000-2), pp. 208–221

== Literature ==
- Gottfried August Benedict Wolff: Chronik des Klosters Pforta nach urkundlichen Nachrichten, Bd. I. Friedrich Christian Wilhelm Vogel, Leipzig 1843, bes. S. 80–82.
- Georg Landau: Beiträge zur Geschichte der Alten Herr- und Handelsstraßen in Deutschland I-II/2. In: Zeitschrift für deutsche Kulturgeschichte. 1 (1856), p. 483–505 [falsche Paginierung], 575–591 und 639–665 (online resource, retrieved 15 August 2011)
- Armin Weber (text); Willi Görich (map): Landstraßen und Chausseebau vom 16. bis 19. Jahrhundert. "andstraßen 16.-18. Jahrhundert". Geschichtlicher Atlas von Hessen. In: Landesgeschichtliches Informationssystem Hessen (LAGIS). and „Chausseebau etwa 1750-1834“„Chausseebau etwa 1750-1834“. Geschichtlicher Atlas von Hessen. In: Landesgeschichtliches Informationssystem Hessen (LAGIS).
- Ulrich Reuling (text), Friedrich Uhlhorn (map): Hessen im Jahre 1789. „Hessen im Jahre 1789“. Geschichtlicher Atlas von Hessen. In: Landesgeschichtliches Informationssystem Hessen (LAGIS).
- Hugo Weczerka: Hansische Handelsstraßen. Bd. I-III (Quellen und Darstellungen zur Hansischen Geschichte 13/1-3), Böhlau, Cologne / Vienna, 1962/67/68.
- Hermann Böttger, Wilhelm Weyer: Alte Straßen und Wege. In: Hermann Böttger, Wilhelm Weyer, Alfred Lück: Geschichte des Netpherlandes. Selbstverlag des Amtes Netphen, Netphen 1967, S. 47–60, bes. S. 54f.
- Hans Hitzer (1971), "Die Straßen vom Mittelalter bis zum Absolutismus", Die Straße. Vom Trampelpfad zur Autobahn. Lebensadern von der Urzeit bis heute (in German), München: G.D.W. Callwey, pp. 129–130, ISBN 3-7667-0201-7
- Gerd Bergmann: Straßen und Burgen um Eisenach. Eisenach 1993, p. 97.
- Wolfgang Eberhardt (1994), "Alte Straßen und Wege von Hessen und Franken nach und durch Thüringen", Zur Geschichte des Landes an der Werra (in German), vol. III (1/1), Bruchsal: Eigenverlag, p. 108
- Friedrich Pfeiffer: Rheinische Transitzölle im Mittelalter. Akademie Verlag, Berlin, 1997, ISBN 3-05-003177-8. (diss. phil. Trier 1996)
- Michel Margue: Entstehung und Entwicklung der brabantischen Städte und die Straße Flandern-Köln (11.–13. Jahrhundert). In: Monika Escher, Alfred Haverkamp, Frank G. Hirschmann: Städtelandschaft – Städtenetz – zentralörtliches Gefüge. Philipp von Zabern, Mainz, 2000, pp. 383–406. (Trierer Historische Forschungen 43)
- Herbert Nicke: Vergessene Wege. Das historische Fernwegenetz zwischen Rhein, Weser, Hellweg und Westerwald; seine Schutzanlagen und Knotenpunkte. Martina Galunder, Nümbrecht 2001, ISBN 3-931251-80-2. (Land und Geschichte zwischen Berg, Wildenburg und Südwestfalen 9)
- Wolfgang Eberhardt (2003), "Thüringer Altstraßen und Wege im Mittelalter zwischen Eisenach - Gotha - Bad Langensalza - Großvargula.", Zur Geschichte des Landes an der Werra (in German), vol. III (1/3), Bad Langensalza: Verlag Rockstuhl, p. 207, ISBN 3-936030-86-3
