= Hamme-Mille =

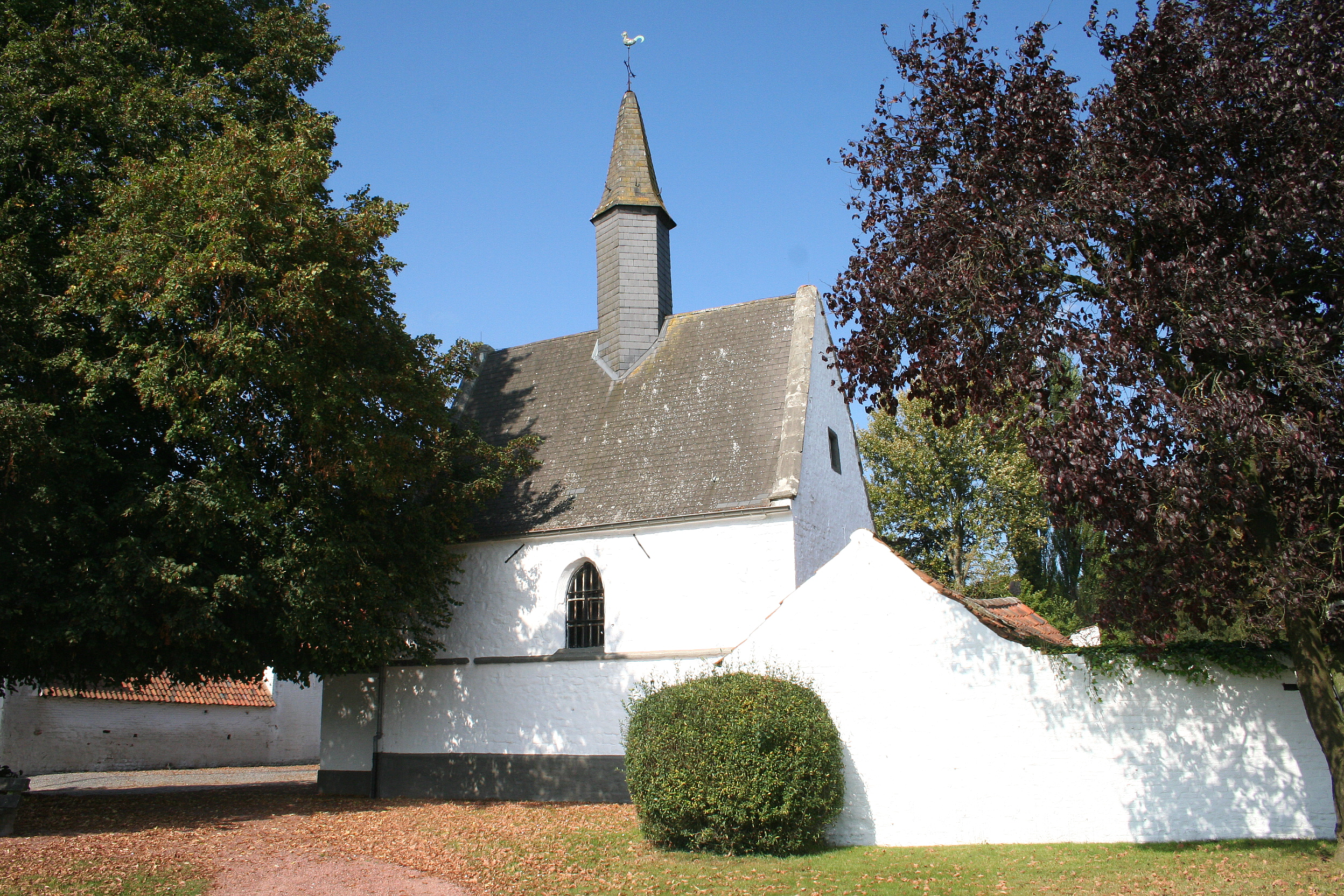
- Hamme-Mille, the chapel (built 1460) in Mille

- Location within Belgium Location within Europe
- Coordinates: 50°46′48″N 04°43′10″E
- Country: Belgium
- Region: Wallonia
- Province: Walloon Brabant
- Municipality: Beauvechain

Hamme-Mille is a district of the municipality of Beauvechain, located in the province of Walloon Brabant, Belgium.

The settlement existed at least from 1146. In 1235, Henry II, Duke of Brabant founded a Cistercian abbey for nuns, the Valduc Abbey, in Hamme. Today nothing remains of the abbey, which was dismantled and sold as rubble following the French Revolution. On its foundations a large country house was built in 1867 and designed by Gérard Van der Linden. In Mille there is also a well-preserved medieval chapel, dedicated to Saint Cornelius. It was built in 1460.
