= Valduc Abbey =

Former abbey in Belgium

Coordinates: 50°47′12″N 04°43′24″E

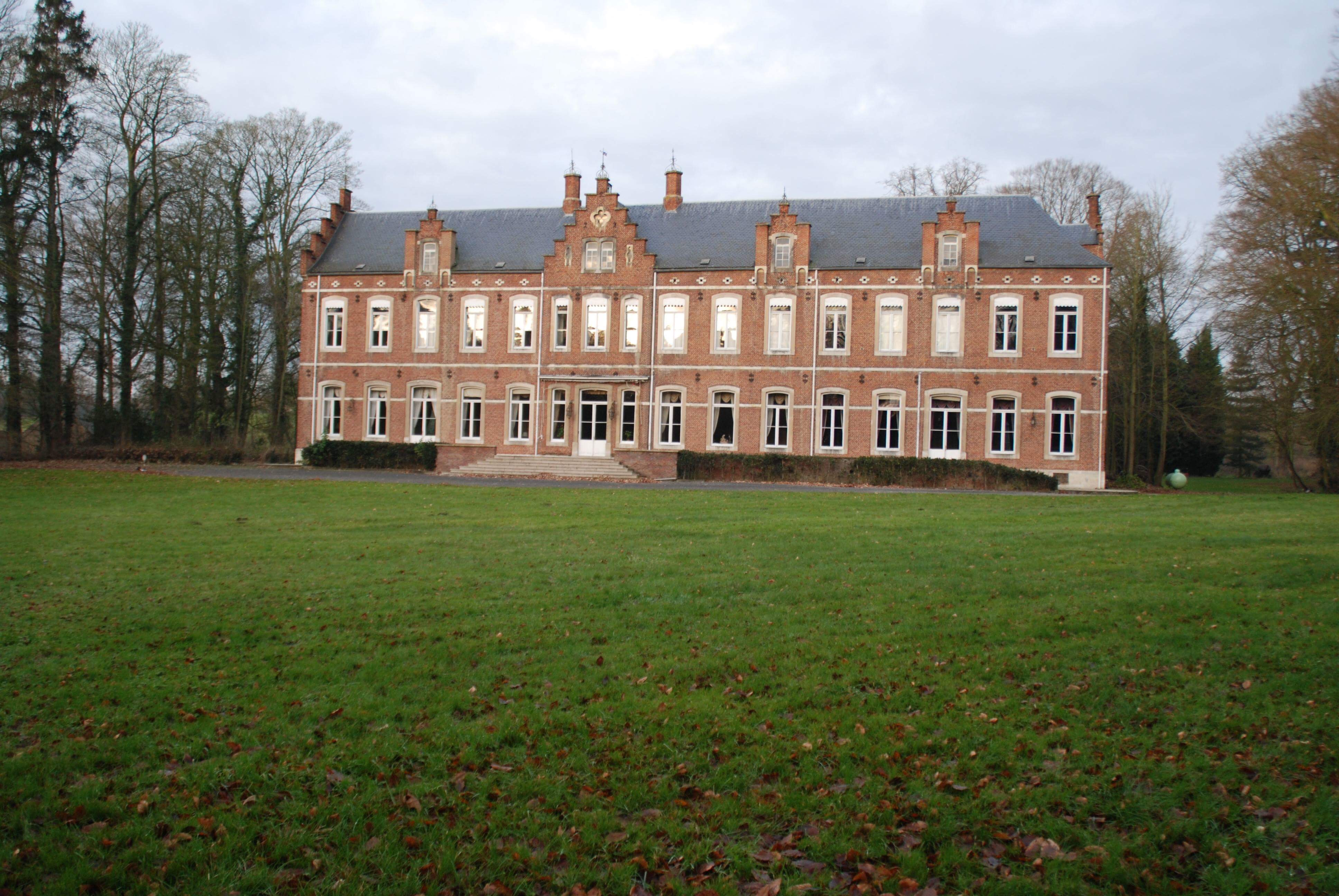
The present château, built at the site of the former Valduc Abbey in 1867

Valduc Abbey (French: Abbaye de Valduc, Dutch: Abdij van Hertogendal) was a Cistercian monastery for nuns founded around 1232. It was located in Hamme-Mille, a district of the current Belgian municipality Beauvechain. Following the French Revolution it was secularised and in 1800 the buildings were sold off as building material and consequently demolished. In 1867 a brick château was erected on the spot of the former monastery.

== History ==
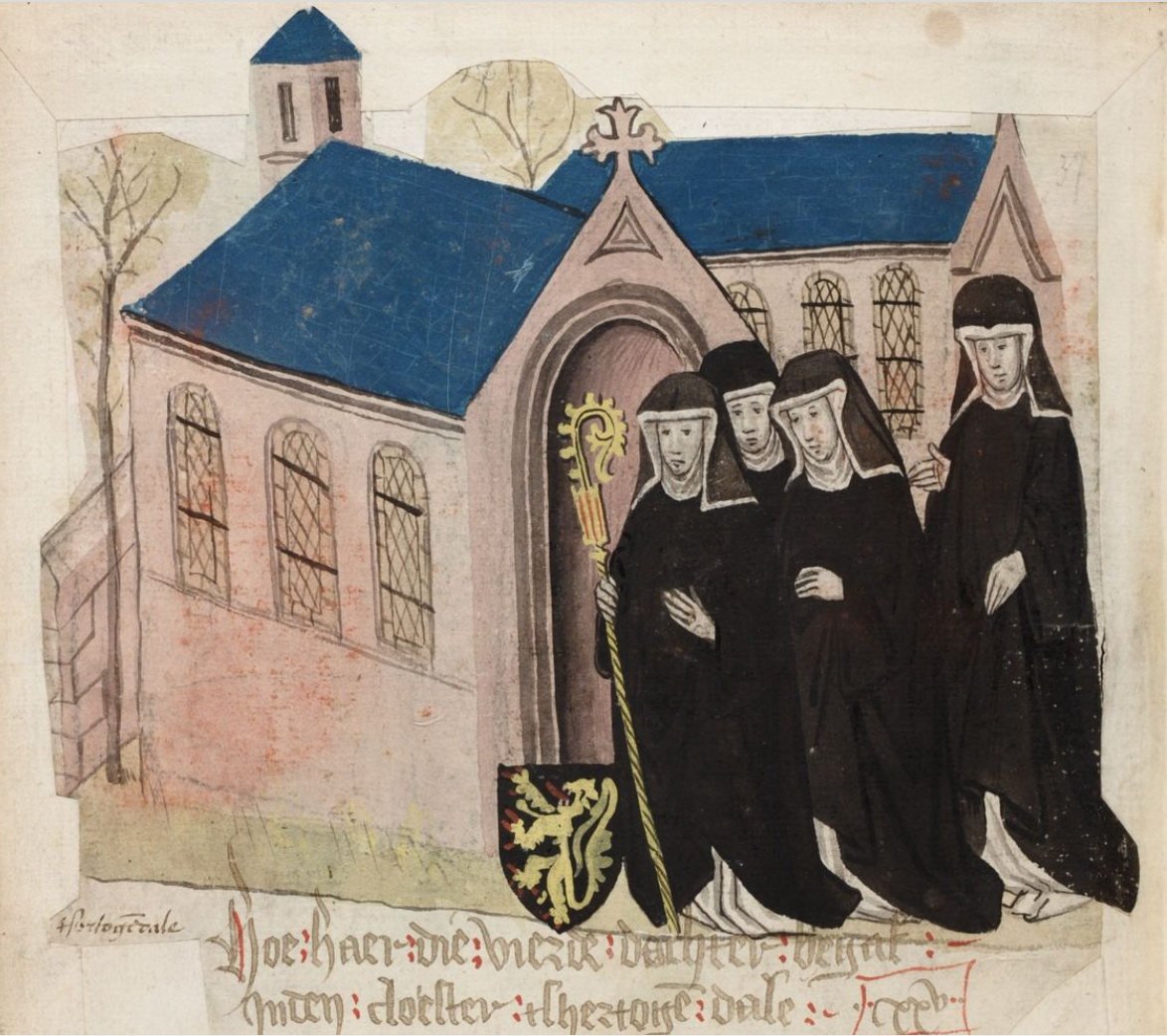
Depiction of Valduc Abbey in a miniature from an early 15th-century manuscript

The abbey was founded as a Cistercian monastery for nuns around 1232 by the Duke of Brabant, Henry II. The abbey underwent several phases of reconstruction, expansion and crisis, but would eventually become quite a big establishment. A time of particular activity was the 15th century. By 1679, the abbey had expanded considerably and the entire village of Hamme-Mille was under its overlordship. During the 18th century, the abbey suffered as a consequence of war and also internal strife. By the later part of the century, it however was substantially rebuilt, probably to designs by Neoclassical architect Laurent-Benoît Dewez.

Following the French Revolution and the ensuing French occupation of Brabant following the War of the First Coalition, the abbey was secularised in 1797. In 1800, the buildings were sold off as building material and consequently demolished. Some of the subsidiary buildings, notably a farmstead (built in the second half of the 18th century) and a water mill (mentioned already in 1431) however remain. On the grounds of the former monastery, a brick château was erected in 1867. It was commissioned by Pierre Craninx, Professor at the University of Leuven, and designed by Gérard Van der Linden in a Neo-Renaissance style.

== Sources ==
- Wilson, Jonathan (2021). The Conquest of Santarém and Goswin’s Song of the Conquest of Alcácer Do Sal: Editions and Translations of De Expugnatione Scalabis and Gosuini de Expugnatione Salaciae Carmen. Routledge. ISBN 9781000384673.
