= Uhlhorn =

Uhlhorn is a surname. Notable people with the surname include:

- Anneliese Uhlhorn, a.k.a. Christa Tordy (1904–1945), German film actress
- Diedrich Uhlhorn (1764–1837), German engineer, mechanic, and inventor
- Friedrich Uhlhorn (1894–1978), German historian
