= Kortrijk City Hall =

- Stadhuis van Kortrijk (Dutch)
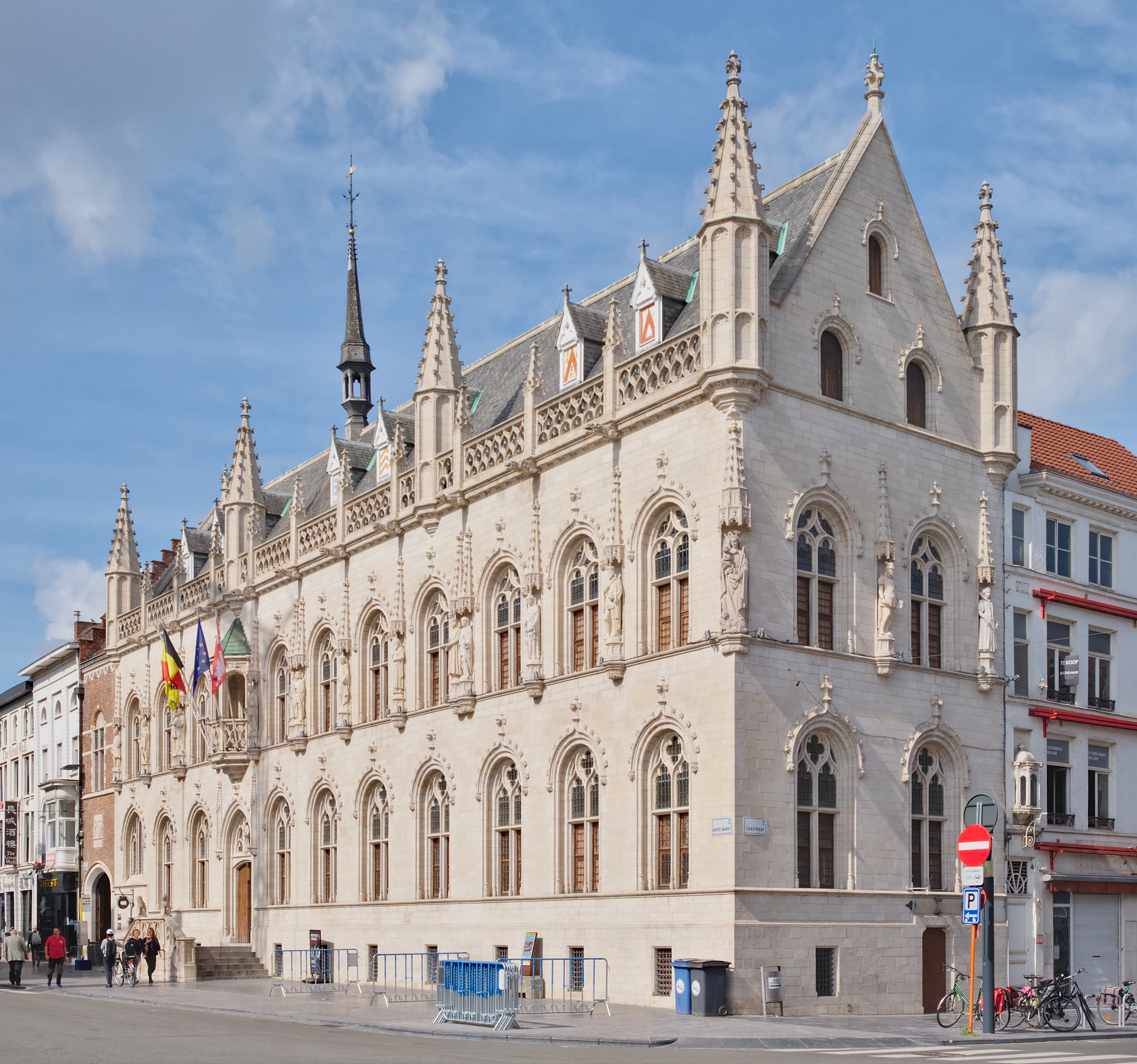
- Kortrijk's City Hall seen from the Grote Markt
- Interactive map of the Kortrijk City Hall area

General information
- Type: Town hall
- Architectural style: Late Gothic; Renaissance
- Location: Grote Markt, Kortrijk, West Flanders, Belgium
- Coordinates: 50°49′41″N 3°15′53″E

The City Hall (Dutch: Stadhuis) of Kortrijk, West Flanders, Belgium, is situated on that city's Grote Markt (main square), between Leiestraat and Rijselsestraat. The facade in late-Gothic or early Renaissance style is adorned with statues of the Counts of Flanders.

== History ==
As early as the 14th century, Kortrijk possessed a town hall, which was, however, completely gutted down by the French army after the victory at Westrozebeke in 1382. In 1420, a larger town hall was built in High Gothic style. The pointed arches in the hall on the ground-flour and upstairs are the only remnants of that building.

The present city hall was erected about 1520 in a style composed of Gothic and Renaissance elements. It was considerably larger than its predecessor. The front was gilded and polychromed (as the front of the Brussels town hall still is).
In 1526, statues of the principal Counts of Flanders were put into niches, which so far had housed prophets' statues. In 1616 the town hall was once more enlarged, with a part of the front in the extant style.

From the end of the 17th and throughout the 18th centuries, the front underwent a series of alterations and mutilations including the addition of a pillory.

In 1807, during the French occupation, the statues and their canopies were removed and the front was flattened out according to the spirit of the age. Around 1850 the front was renovated, but not too successfully. Even while in progress, the artistic value of the restoration was questioned. In 1854, the festive hall was fitted up on the occasion of a visit by king Leopold II and the Queen.

In 1934, the historic Council Chamber was likewise taken in hand. In 1938, the first plans were drawn for the restoration of the building to its 16th-century state. The actual restoration took place from 1958 to 1961.

In 1959, the architects Jos and Luc Viérin supervised the restoration. In 2016, the façade was renovated again.

== Exterior ==
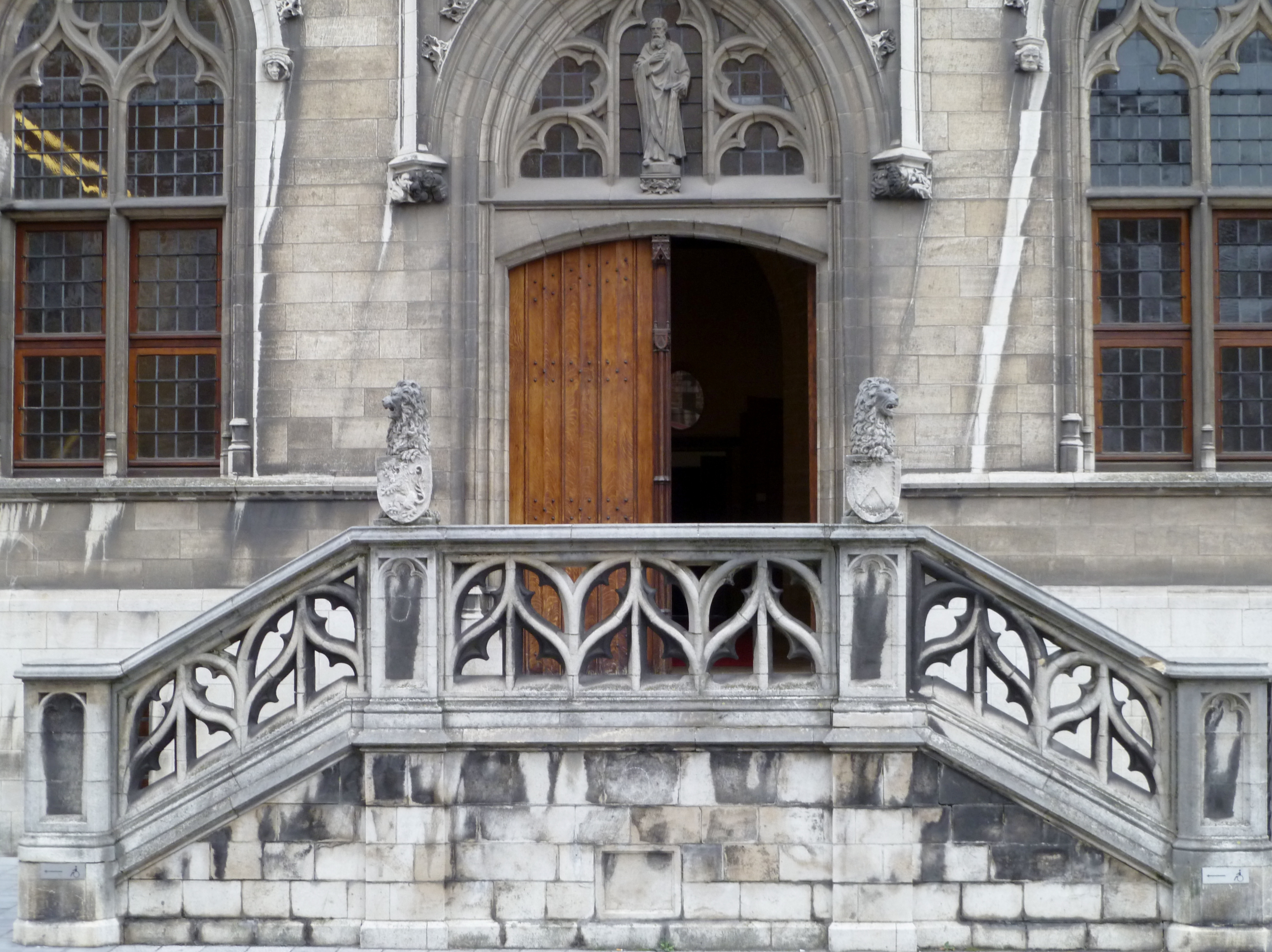
Entrance to Kortrijk's City Hall

The city hall building dates back to the 17th century and is associated with the name of the city’s master builder, Robert Persyn. The 19th century facade has two rows of three windows, two rows of seven windows and a balcony. Nine dormers at the top have wooden shutters which are decorated with the coats of arms of the city of Ypres, Bruges and Ghent, followed by the regions over which Kortrijk exercised authority namely Menen, Deinze, Tielt, Harelbeke and lastly the coat of arms of Kortrijk itself. Above the entrance door is a statue of Saint Paul with a sword, referring to the aldermen’s role of exercising the law.

Between 1856 and 1875 the architect Pierre Nicolas Croquison had the city hall restored, creating the current appearance. The 19th century statues of the facade represent the counts and countesses of Flanders: On the far left is Baldwin Iron Arm and on either side of the small balcony are father Thierry, Count of Flanders aka Diederik (1099-1168) and son Philip van de Elzas (1143-1191) with the coat of arms of Flanders on his chest, which he introduced, the Countess Beatrice of Brabant (1225-1288), lady of the castle of Kortrijk, Count Baldwin IX (1172-1205) with a cross next to his daughter, Joan, Countess of Flanders (1199-1244), often called Joan of Constantinople, and her younger sister, Margaret of Constantinople (1202-1280). The next statue represents Guy of Dampierre (1226–1305), followed by Philip the Good (1396–1467) wears the distinctive chain of the Order of the Golden Fleece, which he founded, Charles V, Holy Roman Emperor (1500-1558), Albert VII, Archduke of Austria (1559–1621) and Isabella Clara Eugenia (1566–1633) which is around the corner of the building in Leiestraat.

== Interior ==
Inside the city hall is the beautiful Aldermen’s hall and the Council room with 16th century sculpted chimneys, decorated with stained glass, wall murals and peculiar topographical maps, aka the Gothic room, on the first floor as well as the modern council chamber to the right of the Aldermen's Chamber.

=== Aldermen’s hall, the Vierschaar ===
The historic Aldermen's Chamber was a tribunal (vierschaar) up to 1787. The magnificent mantelpiece in late gothic style was completed in 1527. Its showpiece is a stone-sculpted decorative fireplace. On the left is a story from the Old Testament: a small group of people with Moses in the middle who is striking a rock causing water to flow for the people travelling through the desert. On the right is a story from the New Testament with doubting Thomas, touching Christ’s wounds before being convinced that he truly is Christ. The purported moral is that faith and tangible evidence are cornerstones for a just decision. On the bottom sections are the coats of arms of the different regions and cities and a Madonna with child seated on a throne in the centre, referring to the Regina Coeli, Queen of Heaven and to Sedes Sapientiae, the Seat of Wisdom.

On the ceiling eight beam supports at the edges are decorated with the theme of justice, represented by Lady Justice wearing a crown. Symbols include a mirror which indicates, that anyone of authority must also be capable of critically assessing his or herself. A jester in a fool’s hat with the ears of a donkey embodies folly, which Justice should meet with love and prudence. The wheel of sun symbolises truth disallowing shady practices. Jugs appear throughout as symbols of her compassion. She offers a jug to a poor person dressed in rags, to a pilgrim (with a ‘pellegrina’ over his shoulders), and to the foolish jester and a man staring death in the face (= a skull). She urges a king to act with humility using a statue of the dying Christ: he removes his crown and she promotes an ordinary man with a backpack to the position of administrator: she places a crown on his head and gives him a generous sack of money.

The mural paintings, made in 1875 after the romantic fashion of that time, depict special scenes of Kortrijk's history. In modern times the hall has been used as wedding-room and reception hall.

=== Council room ===
This hall on the first floor is accessed through a beautiful wooden portico featuring sirens. The chamber contains four fine gothic arches of the early 15th century construction phase. A mantelpiece carved like a lace work out of stone is the show-piece of Kortrijk city hall.

In the centre it shows Charles V, Holy Roman Emperor, administrator of Flanders, with a sword and ‘globus cruciger’ (cross-bearing orb). The eight alcoves to the left and right are occupied by the effigies of unbelief and of the personification of the seven vices. On the left are (1) pride: a woman on a horse holding a mirror; (2) greed: a woman with a moneybag on a mole or toad and (3) lust: a woman on a Billy goat, being embraced by a man. To the right of Charles V, Holy Roman Emperor, (4) envy: a woman on a dog, with a bone in its jaws; (5) gluttony: a woman with a jug on a wild boar; (6) wrath: a woman with a sword on a bear and (7) laziness: a man on a donkey, i.e. all depicted by women except for the last. The images underneath display possible consequences of the vice. Extreme anger results in suicide. Adultery and lust ending up in a cauldron. A malicious devil uses a bellows to stoke up the fire. The wooden statues at the top symbolise faith and the seven virtues: humility, kindness, chastity, charity, temperance, patience and diligence.

The decoration of the eight beam supports show images of women humiliating their lovers, which were popular during the Renaissance. They were meant to be warnings of the power a woman exerted over a man, who usually triumphed through his strength or wisdom: Eve tempting Adam, Aristotle being ridden like a horse by Phyllis, Virgil being hoisted up in a basket but stopping halfway and Samson and Delilah.

The stained-glass windows show the city's coat of arms and those of the 13th century craft guilds, principally textile workers.

=== Cellars ===
Below Kortrijk city hall are six old successive cellars, which belonged to several houses. The largest measures 21 by 10 metres, similar to the hall, whose construction dates back to the early 15th century. The houses had names such as De Zwaan (The Swaan), Het Paerdekin (The Horse Trader’s Son), De Baers (The Boss) or De Zwarte Leeuw (The Black Lion). For centuries, the city hall cellars served as a tavern. In 2006, the last catering establishment, De Raadskelder closed.

== Literature ==
- Sap, H.; Dewilde, B.; Debrabandere, P., Kortrijk nodigt u uit; Courtrai vous invite; Courtray invites you, Delabie, Kortrijk, 1986, 43pp.
