= Robert I of Artois =

Robert I
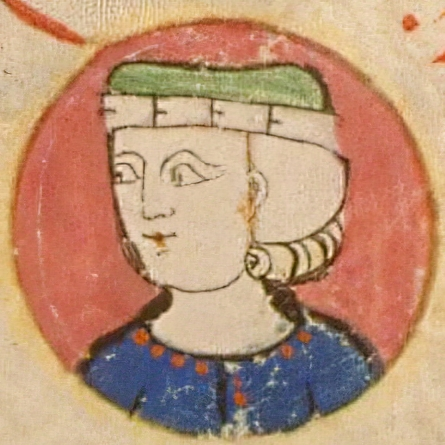

Count of Artois
- Reign: 1237 – 1250
- Successor: Robert II
- Born: 25 September 1216
- Died: 8 February 1250 (aged 33); Mansoura, Ayyubid Sultanate
- Spouse: Matilda of Brabant (m. 1237)
- Issue: Blanche, Queen of Navarre; Robert II, Count of Artois
- House: Capet
- Father: Louis VIII of France
- Mother: Blanche of Castile

Robert I (25 September 1216 – 8 February 1250), called the Good, was the first Count of Artois. He was the fifth (and second surviving) son of King Louis VIII of France and Blanche of Castile.

== Life ==
He received Artois as an appanage, in accordance with the will of his father (died 1226) on attaining his majority in 1237 (aged twenty-one). In 1240 Pope Gregory IX, in conflict with Emperor Frederick II, offered to crown Robert as emperor in opposition to Frederick, but the French count refused to pretend to such a title.

Coat of Arms of Robert of Artois

== Marriage ==
On 14 June 1237 Robert married Matilda, daughter of Henry II of Brabant and Marie of Hohenstaufen.

They had two children:

- Blanche (1248–1302)
- Robert II (1250–1302), who succeeded to Artois.

== Death ==
While participating in the Seventh Crusade, Robert died while leading a reckless attack on Al Mansurah, without the knowledge of his brother King Louis IX. After fording a river, he and a group of Knights Templars charged a Mamluk outpost, during which the Mamluk commander, Fakhr-ad-Din Yusuf, was killed. Emboldened by his success, Robert, the Templar knights, and a contingent of English troops charged into the town and became trapped in the narrow streets. According to Jean de Joinville, Robert defended himself for some time in a house there, but was at last overpowered and killed.

== Sources ==
- Dunbabin, Jean (2014). Charles I of Anjou: Power, Kingship and State-Making in Thirteenth-Century. Routledge.
- Gee, Loveday Lewes (2002). Women, art, and patronage from Henry III to Edward III, 1216-1377. The Boydell Press.
- Nieus, Jean-François (2005). Un pouvoir comtal entre Flandre et France: Saint-Pol, 1000-1300 (in French). De Boeck & Larcier.
- Strayer, Joseph R. (1969). "Crusades of Louis IX". In Setton, Kenneth M. (ed.). A History of the Crusades. Vol. II. University of Wisconsin.
- Wood, Charles T. (1966). The French Apanages and the Capetian Monarchy. Harvard University Press.

French nobility
Vacant Merged into the crown Title last held by Louis	Count of Artois; 1237–1250	Succeeded by Robert II
