= Nodebais =

Village in Brabant, Wallonia

Nodebais Nodebåy (Walloon)
- Village
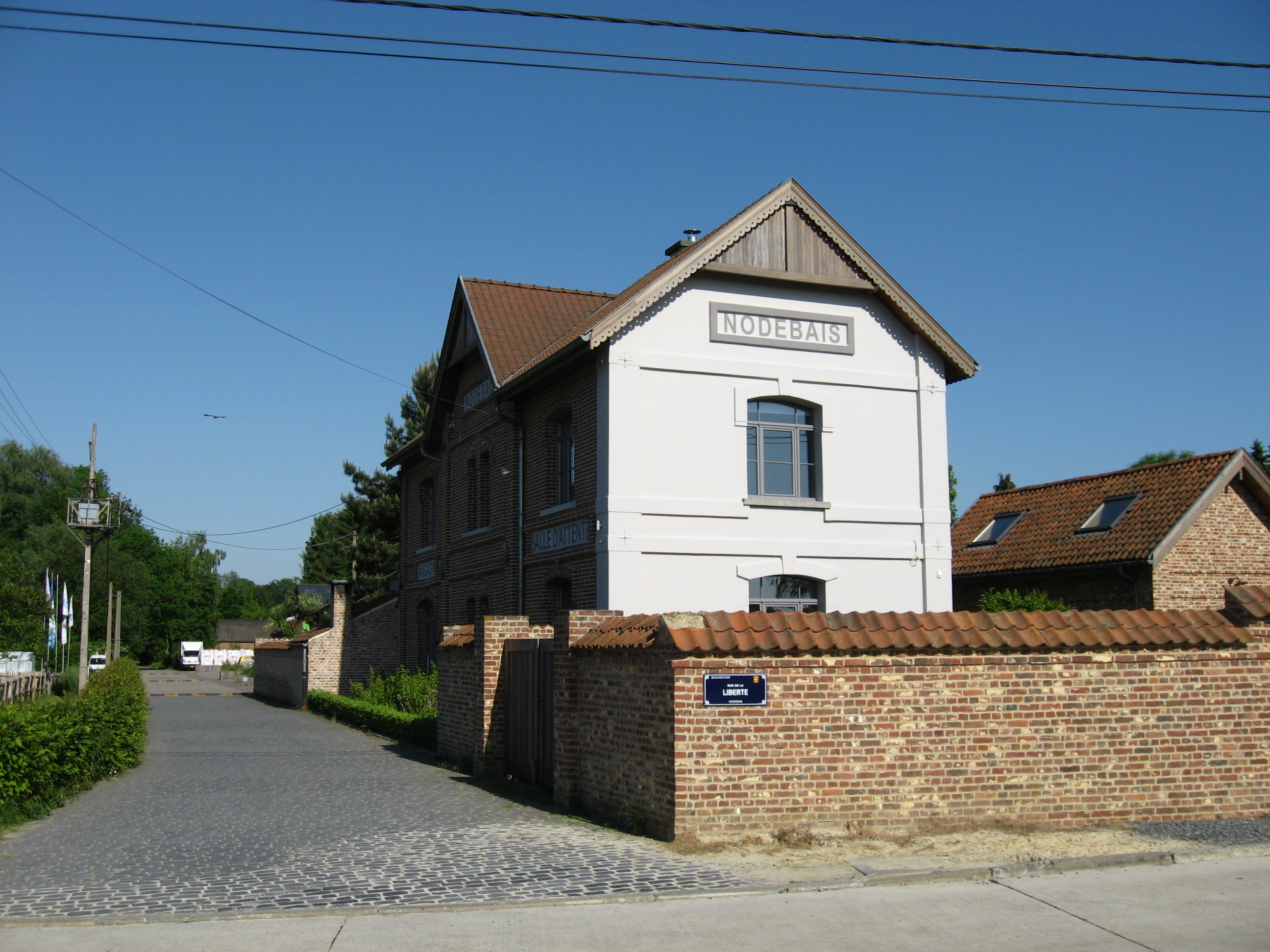
- The station

- Location within Walloon Brabant

- Location in Belgium
- Coordinates: 50°46′21″N 4°44′03″E
- Country: Belgium
- Region: Wallonia
- Province: Walloon Brabant
- Municipality: Beauvechain

Nodebais (French pronunciation: [nɔdbɛ]; Dutch: Nodebeek; Walloon: Nodebåy) is a village of Wallonia and a district of the municipality of Beauvechain, located in the province of Walloon Brabant, Belgium.

It was a municipality in its own right before the fusion of the Belgian municipalities in 1977.
