= Beatrice of Brabant =

Flemish countess

- Langravine of Thüringia; Countess of Flanders
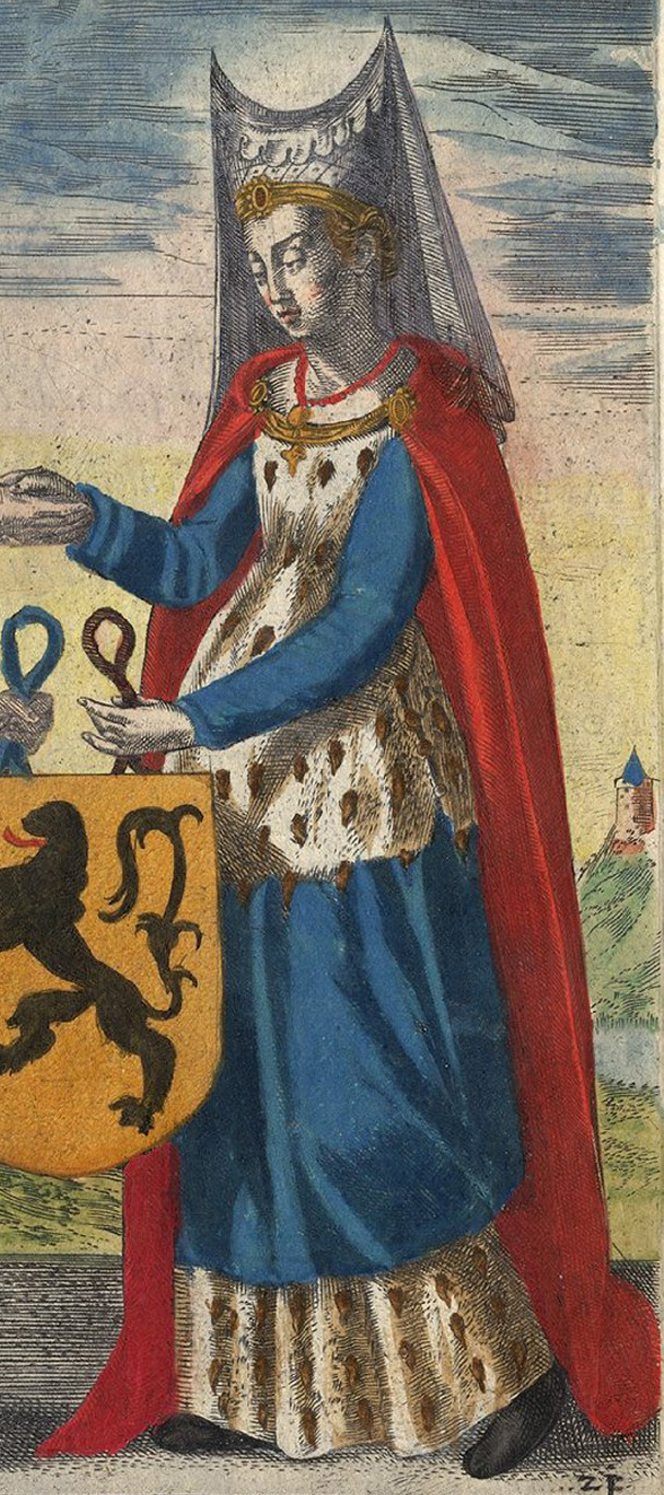
- Beatrice of Brabant
- Born: 1225; Leuven
- Died: 11 November 1288 (aged 62–63); Courtray
- Buried: Courtray Entrails & Heart; Marquette-lez-Lille tomb
- Noble family: Reginar
- Spouses: Henry Raspe, Landgrave of Thuringia; William II, Count of Flanders
- Father: Henry II, Duke of Brabant
- Mother: Marie of Hohenstaufen

Beatrice of Brabant (1225 – 11 November 1288), was a Landgravine consort of Thüringia and a Countess consort of Flanders, married first to Henry Raspe, Landgrave of Thuringia, and later to William II, Count of Flanders.

== Biography ==
Béatrice of Brabant was born 1225 in Leuven. She was the daughter of Henry II, Duke of Brabant, and Marie of Hohenstaufen who was herself daughter of King Philip of Swabia of the Romans. Béatrice had five siblings, including Duke Henry III, and Marie who was executed for infidelity by her husband, Louis II, Duke of Bavaria.

On 10 March 1241, she married Landgrave Henry Raspe (born 1204), who was then proclaimed king of Germany by the factions in 1246. The latter had not been able to sire a child after three years of marriage to his two previous wives, Elisabeth of Brandenburg (1206–1231) and Gertrude of Babenberg. His marriage to Béatrice also remained childless. Henry died of a mortal wound in 1247 without an heir, leaving the county of Thuringia to his nephew Henry.

In November 1247, Béatrice married William II, Count of Flanders, but she was widowed again on 6 June 1251. She was given Kortrijk as a dowry, where she spent another 37 years, the rest of her life. She promoted culture and religion and extended invitations to poets and singers. Thanks to her the Sisters of Groeninge moved from Marke to a new abbey close to the Leie and the road to Ghent (now Abdijkaai). She donated the statue of Our Lady of Groeninghe, which she is said to have received from Pope Honorius IV in 1285. She also donated the candle of Groeninghe, fashioned from a fragment of the Arras candle, reputed to be miraculous, which she had obtained from the Bishop of Arras the same year.

She died in 1288 at the age of 62 or 63, childless. The stones from her heart monument, reused in the later Groeninge Abbey (now museum Kortrijk 1302), were found again. A lead urn containing her heart was preserved in Saint Michael's Church. Her other mortal remains were given a burial place next to that of William in a lost abbey in Northern France.

The 19th century facade of the Kortrijk City Hall, shows a statue of her as lady of the castle of Kortrijk.

== Sources ==
- Dunbabin, Jean (2011). The French in the Kingdom of Sicily, 1266–1305. Cambridge University Press.
- Fried, Johannes; Schieffer, Rudolf, eds. (2008). Deutsches Archiv für Erforschung des Mittelalters (in German). Bohlau Verlag GmbH & Cie, Koln Weimar Wien.
- Vann, Theresa M. (1993). Queens, Regents and Potentates. Academia Press.

| Vacant Title last held by Marie of Champagne | Countess consort of Flanders; 1247-1250 | Vacant Title next held by Matilda of Bethune |
