= Beauvechain =

Municipality in Walloon Brabant province, Wallonia, Belgium

Beauvechain Bôvètchén (Walloon)
- Municipality
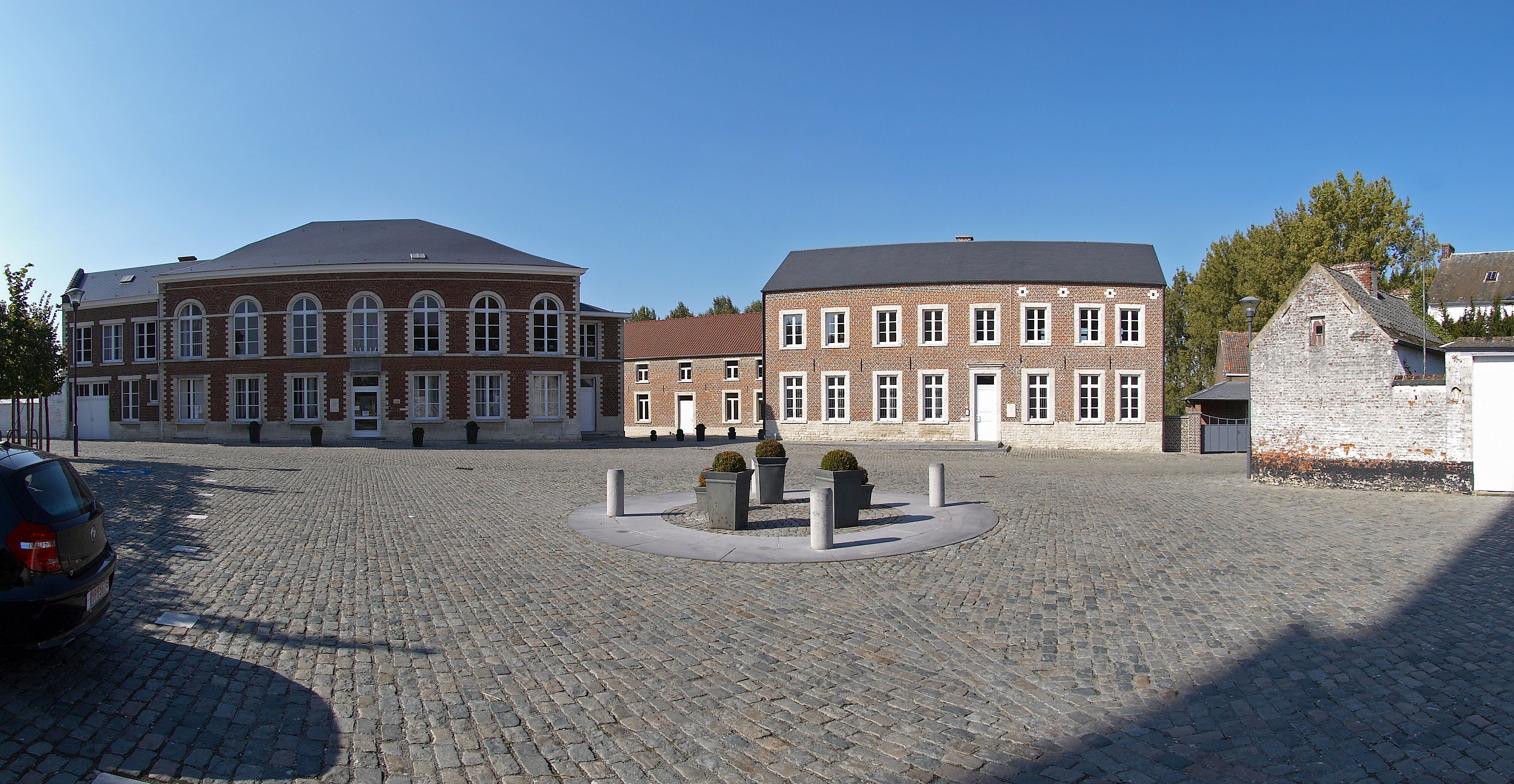
- Beauvechain town square and hall

- Flag Coat of arms

- Location of Beauvechain in Walloon Brabant
- Interactive map of Beauvechain
- Location in Belgium
- Coordinates: 50°47′N 04°46′E
- Country: Belgium
- Community: French Community
- Region: Wallonia
- Province: Walloon Brabant
- Arrondissement: Nivelles

Government
  - Mayor: Carole GHIOT
  - Governing party: Beauvechain Ensemble

Area
  - Total: 38.57 km^{2} (14.89 sq mi)

Population (2018-01-01)
  - Total: 7,222
  - Density: 187.2/km^{2} (485.0/sq mi)
- Postal codes: 1320
- NIS code: 25005
- Area codes: 010
- Website: www.beauvechain.be

Beauvechain (French: [bovəʃɛ̃]; Walloon: Bôvètchén [boːvɛˈtʃe, -ˈtʃẽ]; Dutch: Bevekom [ˈbeːvəkɔm]) is a municipality of Wallonia located in the province of Walloon Brabant, Belgium.

On 1 January 2006 the municipality had 6,529 inhabitants. The total area is 38.58 km^{2}, giving a population density of 169 inhabitants per km^{2}.

The municipality consists of the following districts: Beauvechain, Hamme-Mille, L’Écluse, Nodebais, and Tourinnes-la-Grosse.

Beauvechain has several protected heritage sites. It is also home to Beauvechain Air Base which formerly flew F-16 Fighting Falcon jets.

== Sports ==
Beauvechain is the home of SC Beauvechain football club. Since the 2011–2012 season the club has benefited from investment allowing the creation of new pitches (one synthetic and one grass) as well as a new club house and changing rooms.

== Gallery ==
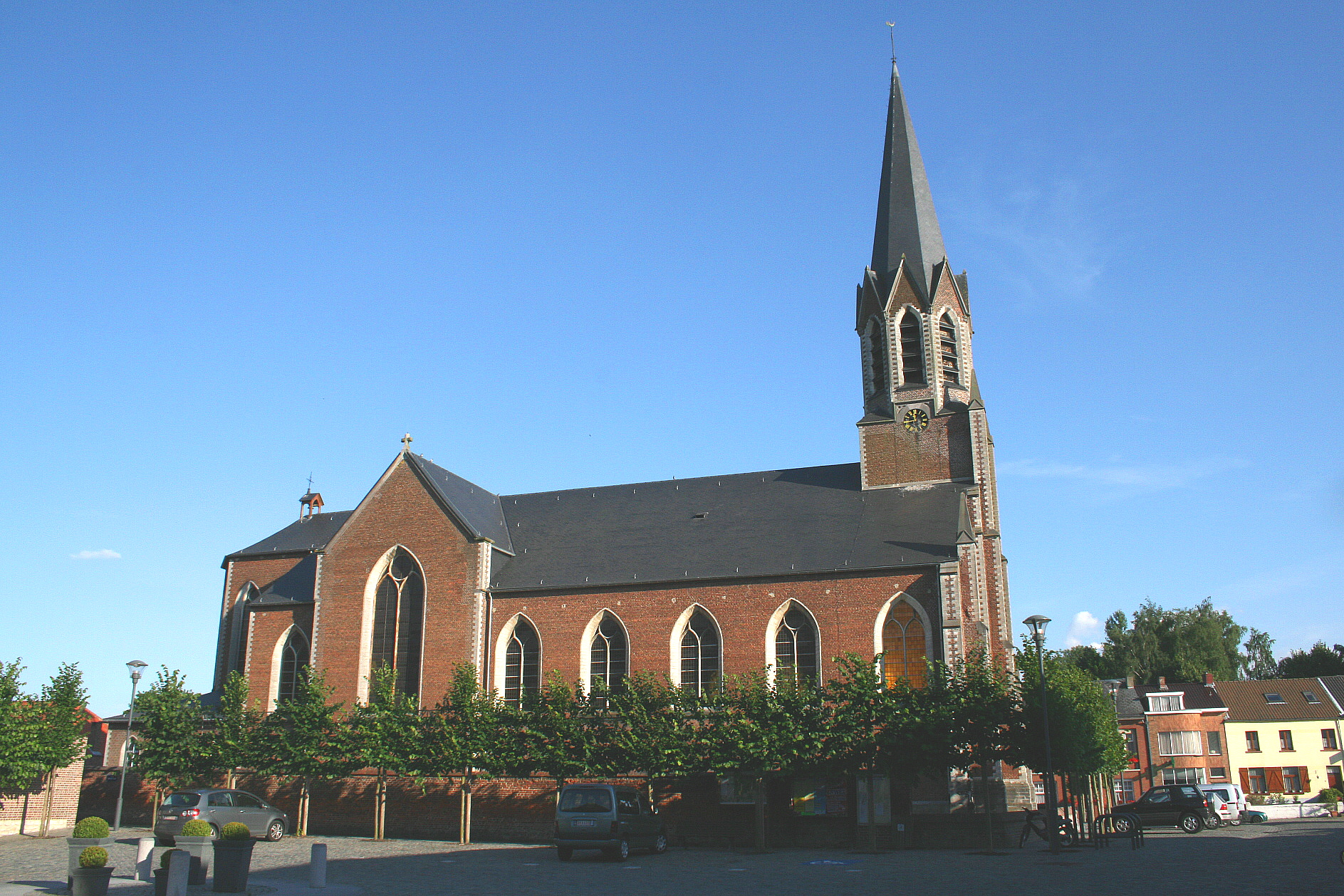
The St-Sulpice church (1853–1860).

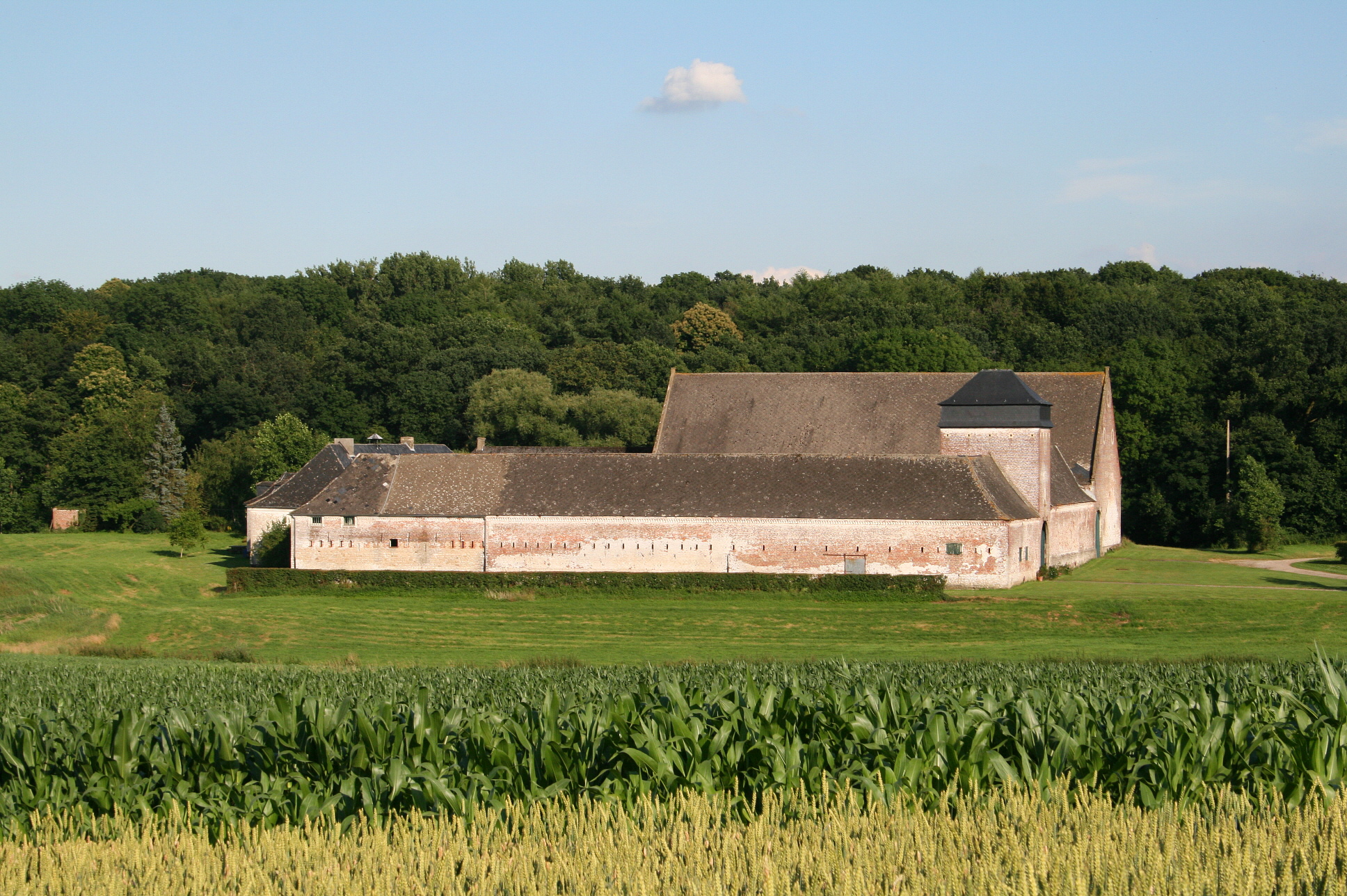
La Bruyère, the farm of Wahenge
