= Sophie of Thuringia, Duchess of Brabant =

German noble (1224–1275)

Sophie of Thuringia
- Duchess of Brabant and Lothier
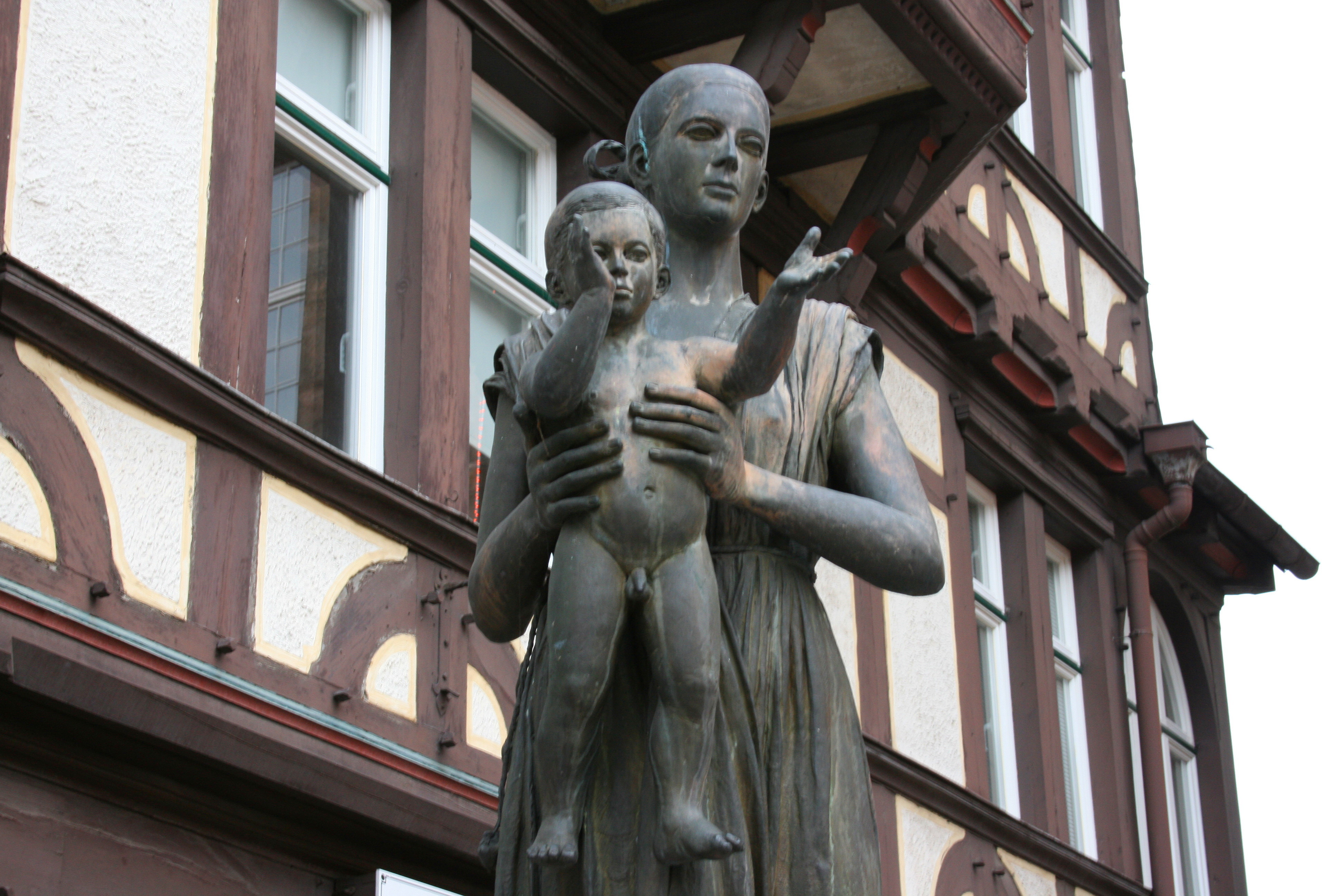
- Statue of Sophie of Thuringia, and her son Henry in Marburg
- Born: 20 March 1224
- Died: 29 May 1275 (aged 51); Marburg
- Buried: Villers Abbey, Brabant
- Noble family: Ludovingians
- Spouses: Henry II, Duke of Brabant and Lothier (m. 1241; died 1248)
- Issue: Henry I, Landgrave of Hesse; Elizabeth of Brabant
- Father: Ludwig IV of Thuringia
- Mother: St. Elisabeth of Hungary

Sophie of Thuringia (20 March 1224 – 29 May 1275) was the second wife and only Duchess consort of Henry II, Duke of Brabant and Lothier. She was the heiress of Hesse which she passed on to her son, Henry upon her retention of the territory following her partial victory in the War of the Thuringian Succession in which she was one of the belligerents. Sophie was the founder of the Brabant dynasty of Hesse.

== Family ==
Sophie was born in Wartburg Castle, near Eisenach in Thuringia, central Germany, on 20 March 1224, the eldest daughter and second child of Louis IV of Thuringia and St. Elisabeth of Hungary, daughter of King Andrew II of Hungary and Gertrude of Merania. The Cronica Reinhardsbrunnensis recorded Sophie's birth: 1224 mensis tercio XX die to beata Elisabeth of filiam Sophiam in castro Wartburg. When Sophie was three years old, her father embarked for the Sixth Crusade, and died unexpectedly of a fever on his way to the Holy Land. Her brother Hermann succeeded as landgrave; however, their uncle Henry Raspe acted as his regent. Sophie and her two siblings were sent away on the orders of their mother's manipulative confessor, Konrad of Marburg. They were placed in Bollenstein Castle, under the supervision of their great-uncle Egbert, Bishop of Bamberg. When Sophie was seven, her mother died, leaving her and her siblings orphans. Upon Elisabeth's death, which had occurred in 1231, Henry Raspe assumed control of Thuringia, becoming its de facto landgrave; and Sophie's brother eventually died in 1241, never having reigned.

== War of the Thuringian Succession ==
When Sophie's uncle, Henry Raspe, Landgrave of Thuringia, died without issue in 1247, Sophie entered into a dispute over the succession to the Ludowinger territories of Thuringia and Hesse to which she was a claimant; her rivals were her cousin, Henry III, Margrave of Meissen and the Archbishopric of Mainz, which claimed the territories as fiefs of the Archbishop. This dispute led to the War of the Thuringian Succession, which lasted for 17 years. Sophie, who was backed by the Hessian nobility, achieved a partial victory in 1264 as she managed to win Hesse, with her son Henry succeeding as the first landgrave by right of his mother; her cousin Henry received Thuringia. The outcome of the dispute was the emergence of Hesse as an independent landgraviate, which eventually became a powerful territorial principality.

== Marriage and offspring ==
In 1241 at the age of 17, Sophie married Henry II, Duke of Brabant and Lothier as his second wife. Her marriage was recorded in the Annales Parchenses. She was his only wife to be styled Duchess of Brabant and Lothier, for Henry's first wife Marie of Hohenstaufen had died just six months before he succeeded his father to the dukedom. Together Henry and Sophie had two children:

- Elisabeth of Brabant (1243 – 17 April/9 October 1261), married Albert I, Duke of Brunswick-Luneburg and had no children.
- Henry I, Landgrave of Hesse "The Child" (24 June 1244 – 21 December 1308), first married Adelheid of Brunswick-Luneburg, with whom he had offspring, and then married Mechthild of Cleves, by whom he had additional offspring.

Sophie also had six stepchildren from her husband's first marriage to Marie.

She was described as having been an "energetic and courageous woman, proud of her saintly ancestry". She began all her letters and charters with the following: "We, Sophie, duchess of Brabant, daughter of St. Elisabeth".

After the death of her husband, Sophie resided in a castle situated beside the Dijle river in the village of Sint-Agatha-Rode, Brabant.

She died on 29 May 1275 in Marburg, and was buried in Villers Abbey in Brabant. There is a statue representing her and her son Henry in the square in front of the town hall in Marburg.

== Sources ==
- Bumke, Joachim (1991). Courtly Culture: Literature and Society in the High Middle Ages. Translated by Dunlap, Thomas. University of California Press. ISBN 978-0-520-06634-2.
- von Jeroschin, Nicolaus (2010). The Chronicle of Prussia by Nicolaus von Jeroschin: A History of the Teutonic Knights in Prussia, 1190-1331. Translated by Fischer, Mary. Ashgate Publishing Limited.
- Rasmussen, Ann Marie (1997). Mothers and Daughters in Medieval German Literature. Syracuse University Press. ISBN 978-0-8156-0389-4.
- Teszelszky, Kees (2014). "Crown and Kingdom in the Republic: The Cultural Construction and Literary Representation of Early Modern Hungary in the Low Countries (1588-1648)". In Teszelszky, Kees (ed.). A Divided Hungary in Europe: Exchanges, Networks and Representations, 1541–1699. Vol. 3. Cambridge Scholars Publishing. pp. 145–166.
- Wolf, Kenneth Baxter, ed. (2010). The life and afterlife of St. Elizabeth of Hungary : testimony from her canonization hearings. Oxford: Oxford University Press. ISBN 978-0-19-978117-1. OCLC 688622151.

Royal titles
Preceded by Marie of France	Duchess of Brabant and Lothier; 1240–1248	Succeeded by Adelaide of Burgundy
