= Matilda of Brabant, Countess of Artois =

Flemish noblewoman (1224–1288)

Matilda of Brabant
- Countess of Artois; Countess of Saint-Pol
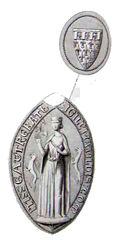
- Medallion of Matilda of Brabant
- Born: 14 June 1224
- Died: 29 September 1288 (aged 64)
- Noble family: Reginar
- Spouses: Robert I of Artois; Guy III, Count of Saint-Pol
- Issue: Blanche, Queen of Navarre; Robert II, Count of Artois; Guy IV, Count of Saint-Pol; Hugh II, Count of Blois; Jacques I of Leuze-Châtillon; Beatrix, Countess of Eu; Jeanne, Lady of Châteauroux; Gertrude, Lady of Mechelen
- Father: Henry II, Duke of Brabant
- Mother: Marie of Hohenstaufen

Matilda of Brabant (14 June 1224 – 29 September 1288) was the eldest daughter of Henry II, Duke of Brabant and his first wife Marie of Hohenstaufen.

== Marriages and issue ==
On 14 June 1237, which was her 13th birthday, Matilda married her first husband Robert I of Artois. Robert was the son of Louis VIII of France and Blanche of Castile. They had:

- Blanche of Artois (1248 – 2 May 1302). Married first Henry I of Navarre and secondly Edmund Crouchback, 1st Earl of Lancaster.
- Robert II, Count of Artois (1250 – 11 July 1302 at the Battle of the Golden Spurs).

On 8 February 1250, Robert I was killed while participating in the Seventh Crusade. On 16 January 1255, Matilda married her second husband Guy III, Count of Saint-Pol. He was a younger son of Hugh I, Count of Blois and Mary, Countess of Blois. They had:

- Guy IV, Count of Saint-Pol (1254 - 1317), Count of Saint Pol
- Hugh II, Count of Blois (1258 - 1307), Count of Saint Pol and later Count of Blois
- Jacques I of Leuze-Châtillon (died 11 July 1302 at the Battle of the Golden Spurs), first of the lords of Leuze, married Catherine de Condé and had issue; his descendants brought Condé, Carency, etc. into the House of Bourbon.
- Beatrix (died 1304), married John I of Brienne, Count of Eu
- Jeanne, married Guillaume III de Chauvigny, Lord of Châteauroux
- Gertrude, married Florent, Lord of Mechelen (French: Malines).

== Sources ==
- Dunbabin, Jean (2011). The French in the Kingdom of Sicily, 1266–1305. Cambridge University Press.
- Dunbabin, Jean (2014). Charles I of Anjou: Power, Kingship and State-Making in Thirteenth-Century. Routledge.
- Gee, Loveday Lewes (2002). Women, art, and patronage from Henry III to Edward III, 1216-1377. The Boydell Press.
- Nieus, Jean-François (2005). Un pouvoir comtal entre Flandre et France: Saint-Pol, 1000-1300. De Boeck & Larcier.
- Pollock, M.A. (2015). Scotland, England and France after the Loss of Normandy, 1204-1296. The Boydell Press.
- Strayer, Joseph R. (1969). "Crusades of Louis IX". In Setton, Kenneth M. (ed.). A History of the Crusades. Vol. II. University of Wisconsin.
