= Maria of Swabia =

German noble (1201–1235)

Maria of Hohenstaufen
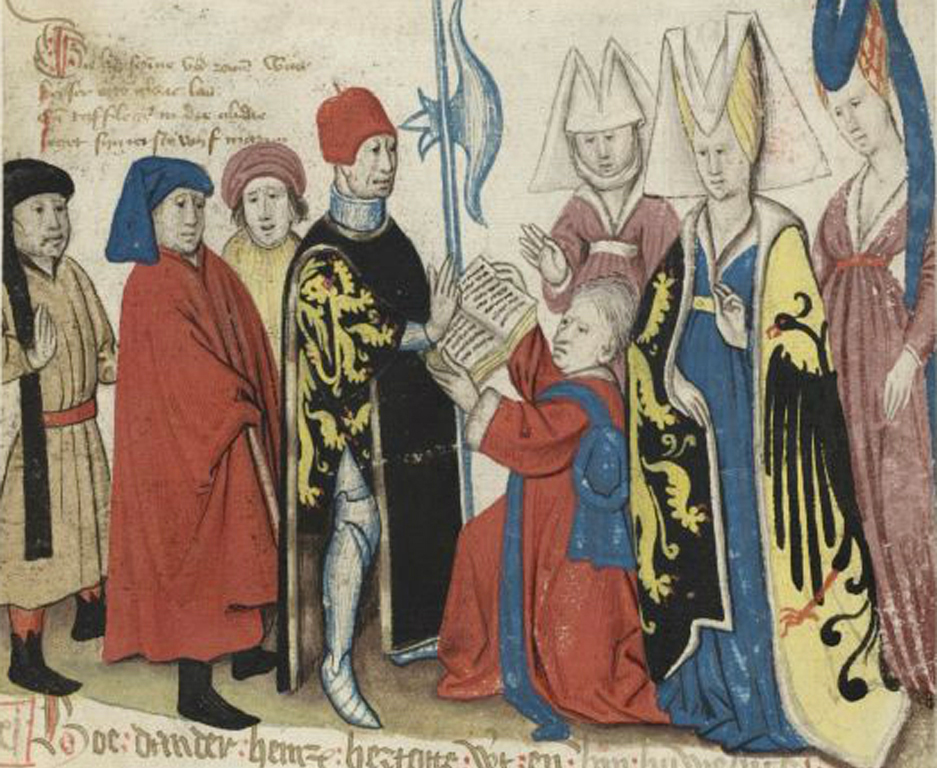
- Born: 1199/1200; Arezzo, Tuscany, Italy
- Died: 29 March 1235 (aged 35-36); Leuven, Brabant
- Noble family: Hohenstaufen
- Spouses: Henry II, Duke of Brabant and Lothier
- Issue: Matilda, Countess of Artois; Beatrice, Countess of Flanders; Maria, Duchess of Bavaria; Margaret of Brabant; Henry III, Duke of Brabant; Philip of Brabant
- Father: Philip of Swabia
- Mother: Irene Angelina of Byzantium

Maria of Swabia (1199/1200 – 29 March 1235) was a member of the powerful Hohenstaufen dynasty of German kings.

== Family ==
Maria of Hohenstaufen was born in Arezzo, Tuscany, Italy around 1199/1200. She was the second daughter of Philip of Swabia and Irene Angelina of Byzantium. In 1208, at the age of seven, Maria was left an orphan by the unexpected deaths of her parents. On 21 June, her father was murdered by Otto of Wittelsbach, and two months later her mother died after giving birth to a daughter, who did not live beyond early infancy.

== Marriage and issue ==
Sometime before 22 August 1215, she married Henry II, heir to the Duchy of Brabant (present-day Belgium) and Lothier. They had:

- Matilda of Brabant (14 June 1224 – 29 September 1288), married firstly, Robert I of Artois, by whom she had two children, Robert II of Artois and Blanche of Artois; she married secondly Guy III, Count of Saint-Pol, by whom she had six children.
- Beatrix of Brabant (1225 – 11 November 1288), married firstly Henry Raspe, Landgrave of Thuringia, and secondly William III of Dampierre. She died childless.
- Maria of Brabant (c. 1226 – 18 January 1256), married Louis II, Duke of Bavaria. She was beheaded by her husband on suspicion of infidelity.
- Margaret of Brabant (died 14 March 1277), Abbess of Herzogenthal.
- Henry III, Duke of Brabant (c. 1230 – 28 February 1261), married Adelaide of Burgundy (c. 1233 – 23 October 1273), daughter of Hugh IV, Duke of Burgundy, by whom he had issue
- Philip of Brabant, died young.

== Death ==
Maria of Hohenstaufen died on 29 March 1235 in Leuven, Brabant, five days before her thirty-fourth birthday. Less than six months later, her husband succeeded his father as Duke of Brabant and Lothier.

== Sources ==
- Baldwin, Philip B. (2014). Pope Gregory X and the Crusades. The Boydell Press.
- Bumke, Joachim (1991). Courtly Culture: Literature and Society in the High Middle Ages. Translated by Dunlap, Thomas. University of California Press.
- Dunbabin, Jean (2011). The French in the Kingdom of Sicily, 1266–1305. Cambridge University Press.
