= Henry II of Brabant =

Duke of Brabant and Lothier from 1235

Henry II
- Duke of Brabant; Duke of Lothier
- Henry's seal
- Born: 1207
- Died: 1 February 1248 (aged 40–41); Leuven
- Buried: Villers Abbey
- Noble family: Reginar
- Spouses: Marie of Hohenstaufen; Sophie of Thuringia
- Issue: Matilda of Brabant; Beatrice of Brabant; Maria of Brabant; Margaret; Henry III, Duke of Brabant; Philip; Elizabeth; Henry I, Landgrave of Hesse
- Father: Henry I, Duke of Brabant
- Mother: Mathilde of Flanders

Henry II of Brabant (Dutch: Hendrik, French: Henri; 1207 – 1 February 1248) was Duke of Brabant and Lothier after the death of his father Henry I in 1235. His mother was Matilda of Boulogne.

Henry II supported his sister Mathilde's son, William II of Holland, in his bid for election as king of Germany. He founded Valduc Abbey in 1232.

== Marriages and death ==
His first marriage was to Marie of Hohenstaufen (3 April 1207–1235, Leuven), daughter of Philip of Swabia and Irene Angelina. They had:

1. Matilda of Brabant (1224 – 29 September 1288), married:
  1. Robert I of Artois, 14 June 1237, in Compiègne
  2. before 31 May 1254 to Guy II of Châtillon, Count of Saint Pol.
2. Beatrix (1225 – 11 November 1288), married:
  1. at Creuzburg 10 March 1241, Heinrich Raspe, Landgrave of Thuringia;
  2. in Leuven November 1247 to William III of Dampierre, Count of Flanders (1224 – 6 June 1251).
3. Maria of Brabant (c.1226 – 18 January 1256, Donauwörth), married Louis II, Duke of Upper Bavaria. She was beheaded by her husband on suspicion of infidelity.
4. Margaret (d. 14 March 1277), Abbess of Valduc Abbey (Hertogendal).
5. Henry III, Duke of Brabant (1230–1261)
6. Philip, died young

His second marriage was to Sophie of Thuringia (20 March 1224 – 29 May 1275), daughter of Ludwig IV of Thuringia and Saint Elisabeth of Hungary, by whom he had two children:

1. Elizabeth (1243 – 9 October 1261), married Albert I, Duke of Brunswick-Lüneburg
2. Henry (1244–1308), created Landgrave of Hesse in 1264.

Henry died in Leuven, aged about 40.

== Sources ==
- Baldwin, Philip B. (2014). Pope Gregory X and the Crusades. The Boydell Press.
- Commire, Anne; Klezmer, Deborah, eds. (2001). "Maude of Brabant (1224-1288)". Women in World History: A Biographical Encyclopedia. Vol. 10: Maa-Mei. Yorkin Publications. pp. 637–638. ISBN 0-7876-4069-7.
- Dunbabin, Jean (2011). The French in the Kingdom of Sicily, 1266–1305. Cambridge University Press.
- Fried, Johannes; Schieffer, Rudolf, eds. (2008). Deutsches Archiv für Erforschung des Mittelalters (in German). Bohlau Verlag GmbH & Cie, Koln Weimar Wien.
- Loud, Graham A.; Schenk, Jochen, eds. (2017). The Origins of the German Principalities, 1100-1350: Essays by German Historians. Routledge.
- Morganstern, Anne McGee (2000). Gothic Tombs of Kinship in France, the Low Countries, and England. The Pennsylvania State University Press.
- Nieus, Jean-François (2005). Un pouvoir comtal entre Flandre et France: Saint-Pol, 1000-1300 (in French). De Boeck & Larcier.
- Teszelszky, Kees, ed. (2014). A Divided Hungary in Europe: Exchanges, Networks and. Vol. 3. Cambridge Scholars Publishing.
- Wilson, Jonathan (2021). The Conquest of Santarém and Goswin’s Song of the Conquest of Alcácer Do Sal: Editions and Translations of De Expugnatione Scalabis and Gosuini de Expugnatione Salaciae Carmen. Routledge. ISBN 9781000384673.

== See also ==
- Dukes of Brabant family tree

Regnal titles
Preceded by Henry I	Duke of Brabant and Lothier; 1235–1248	Succeeded by Henry III
