= Friedrich Uhlhorn =

German regional historian

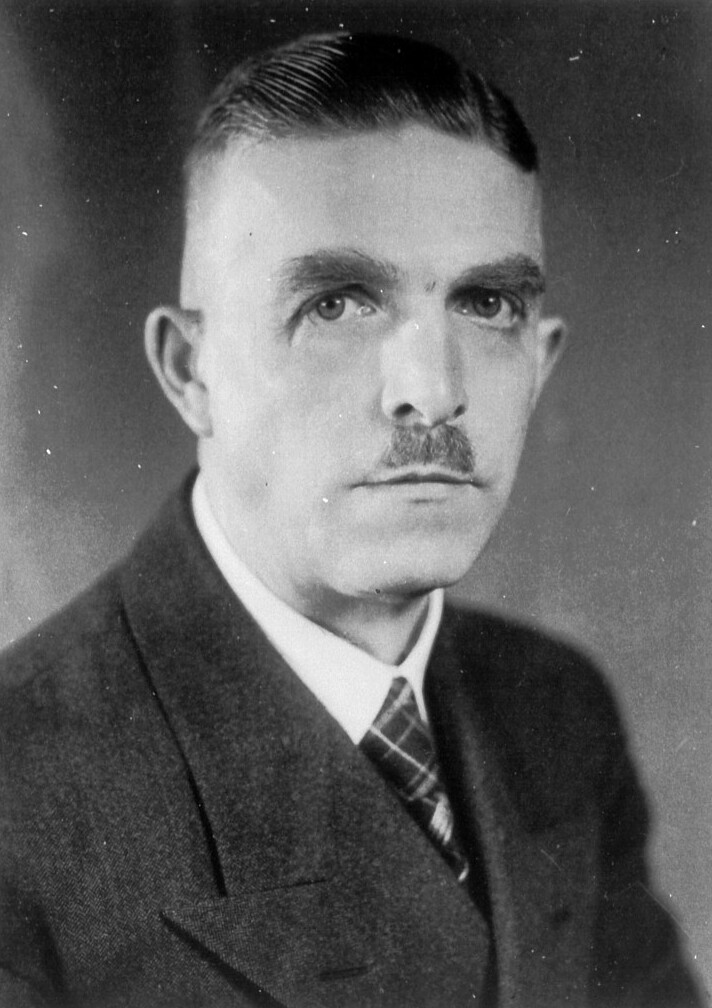
Friedrich Uhlhorn.

Friedrich Uhlhorn (17 June 1894 – 24 July 1978) was an honorary professor at the Philipps-Universität Marburg, whose scientific focus was on the history of the State of Hesse and was also known for his work outside Hesse. His special scientific interest was mainly focused on the problems of historical cartography. In collaboration with Edmund Ernst Stengel, he published the Geschichtlichen Atlas von Hessen, which is considered his major work. He also wrote the article Die deutschen Territorien. A: The West, which deals with the West German regional history. Likewise he was responsible as editor for the Hessisches Jahrbuch für Landesgeschichte by Bruno Gebhardt.

== Life ==
=== Youth ===
Born in Lauenförde, Uhlhorn came from a family of theologians in southern Lower Saxony. He was born as son of the pastor Friedrich Uhlhorn and his wife Elisabeth née Müller. Uhlhorn's school education began in 1901, He acquired his Abitur on 24 February 1914 at the humanistic grammar school in Hameln.

=== Academic career ===
From August 1914 to 1918 Uhlhorn did his military service in the First World War. His studies officially began in 1914, after the First World War he continued them from 1919 to 1923. He studied history, German and Latin in Marburg and Göttingen and finished his studies with the Staatsexamen in 1923. During his studies he became a member of the AMV Fridericiana Marburg. He also began training as an archivist in Berlin-Dahlem. He soon returned to Marburg for good, however, to prepare his doctorate under Edmund E. Stengel. The title of this auxiliary-scientific work, which was published in 1924, is Die Großbuchstaben der sogenannten gotischen Schrift mit besonderer Berücksichtigung der Hildesheimer Stadtschreiber (The Capital Letters of the so-called Gothic Script with Special Consideration of the Hildesheim Town Writers). From 1923 to 1946, Uhlhorn worked as archivist of the House of the Princes and counts of Solms, with the task to write a history of the House.

During this period he was a lecturer from 1936, and from 1940 honorary professor at the Philipps-Universität Marburg for Hessian local history.

=== Hessian Regional Studies ===
His connection to his doctoral supervisor Edmund E. Stengel and the "Atlaswerkstatt", the later Hessisches Landesamt für geschichtliche Landeskunde with its seat in the Kugelhaus in Marburg, also continued during his work as archivist. From 1935, Uhlhorn was responsible for Edmund Stengel's new project, and he was also in charge of the preparation of the Geschichtliche Hand- und Volksatlas von Hessen. This atlas was financed with funds from the Kassel district government and was to be produced alongside the primary academic atlas Geschichtlicher Atlas für Hessen und Nassau. Stengel named the Hessian people and the Hessian youth as a target group in order to bring the Hessian landscape closer to them again. By the beginning of the Second World War, however, it was no more than a draft.

After the Second World War, in which he participated just as in the First World War, he became curator at the Hessian State Office for Historical Regional Studies in 1947. After the end of the war, Uhlhorn pursued the goal of providing a first delivery of atlas maps for the entire area. Thus he prepared political maps for the years 1550, 1648 and 1789, which were never published. The project was later discontinued despite Uhlhorn's intensive efforts. Uhlhorn also started work on the Geschichtlichen Handatlas during this period. Following on from the work before the outbreak of war, this atlas was intended to serve schools, universities and all those interested in history as a reference and illustrative work. Uhlhorn worked intensively on this project, various government agencies were interested in the creation of this map series, which ultimately convinced Stengel, who was not too keen, of the necessity of this project and put the completion of the "großen Atlas" first.

This project was not completed in addition to the many other projects. However, a number of smaller scientific atlases were published, one of the first in Germany being the Geschichtlicher Atlas von Hessen. From the winter semester of 1964 he was granted a leave of absence for health reasons. Even after his retirement, Uhlhorn continued to work on this atlas and its design and layout, From 1960 to 1978, twelve volumes were published, comprising a total of 79 maps and 53 sheets. The volume with text and explanations published by Fred Schwind in 1984 concluded the atlas.

Uhlhorn died in Marburg on July 24, 1978 at the age of 84 and was buried at the cemetery at Rotenberg in Marburg. The city of Marburg declared his grave a municipal grave of honour.

== Achievements ==
Uhlhorn's achievements in the scientific field of Hesse's state history are particularly noteworthy. He was well known beyond the borders of Hesse, for example, as he dealt with the historical foundations of the present-day state of Hesse at an early stage. His collaboration on the Geschichtlichen Atlas von Hessen, which is his main work, his function as chairman of the Marburg Historical Society, but not least his numerous publications on Hessian state history topics clearly show his deep connection to Hessian history and his interest in research until his death in 1978. In his obituary of him, Fred Schwind emphasizes that during his time as archivist of the Princely House of Solms, he sought to convey to his students the "insight into the intimate relationship between the landscape and the historically active man [...] in his lectures and especially on excursions." From 1951 on, he was responsible as editor for the first 14 volumes of the Hessian Hessischen Jahrbuchs für Landesgeschichte and is thus also significantly involved in its presentation and the high standing it occupies among the journals of the State history.

== Writings ==
- Die Großbuchstaben der sogenannten gotischen Schrift mit besonderer Berücksichtigung der Hildesheimer Stadtschreiber. Tondeur & Säuberlich, Leipzig 1924.
- "Grundzüge der Wetterauer Territorialgeschichte." In Friedberger Geschichtsblätter, vol. 8, issues 10 and 11, 1927, pp. 143–166.
- "Die mittelalterlichen Befestigungen der Stadt Lich." In Volk und Scholle. Heimatblätter für beide Hessen, Nassau und Frankfurt a. M., vol. 7, issue 10, 1929, pp. 318–321.
- "Die Solmser Archive in der Wetterau. Vortrag gehalten am 8. September 1929 auf dem XXI. Archivtag zu Marburg." In Archivalische Zeitschrift, vol. 6, 1930, pp. 69–80.
- Geschichte der Grafen von Solms im Mittelalter. Kerte, Marburg 1931.
- "Zur Geschichte der Breidenbachschen Pilgerfahrt." In Gutenberg-Jahrbuch 1934, pp. 107–111.
- "Das Institut für geschichtliche Landeskunde von Hessen und Nassau in Marburg." In Hessenland, vol. 45, 1934.
- "Die Erfindung des Walzwerkes und seine Förderung durch Graf Reinhard zu Solms-Lich." In Deutsche Münzblätter, Jahrgang 55, Nr. 388, 1935.
- with Paul Bamberg: "Das Münz-Walzwerk des Grafen Reinhard zu Solms." In Deutsche Münzblätter, Jahrgang 55, Nr. 389, 1935.
- Hessen und das Reich. Vortrag gehalten in der 42. Jahresversammlung der Historischen Kommission für Hessen und Waldeck am 10. Juni 1939. (Jahresbericht der Historischen Kommission für Hessen und Waldeck, Beilage 42), Marburg 1939.
- "Aus alten Bellersheimer Markrechnungen." In Mitteilungen des Oberhessischen Geschichtsvereins Gießen, vol. 36, 1939, pp. 1–10.
- "Ein Beitrag zur Erbacher Genealogie." In Archiv für hessische Geschichte und Altertumskunde, vol. 21, 1940, pp. 128–135.
- Regesten der Urkunden des Graf zu Solms-Rödelheimschen Archivs zu Assenheim. 1st and 2nd volumes (typewritten).
- "Johann Albrecht Graf zu Solms-Braunfels 1563 bis 1623." In Nassauische Lebensbilder, herausgegeben von Rudolf Vaupel, Fritz Adolf Schmidt, Karl Wolf, vol. 3, Wiesbaden 1948, pp. 127–145.
- "Geschichte der Stadt Lich." In Licher Heimatbuch, edited by Kurt Zeiger, Self-published by the city of Lich, Lich 1950, pp. 9–24.
- "Geschichte der Fürsten zu Solms-Hohensolms-Lich." In Licher Heimatbuch, edited by Kurt Zeiger, Self-published by the city of Lich, Lich 1950, pp. 172–181.
- "Zur Geschichte der Modellierbogen." In Hessische Blätter für Volkskunde, vol. 42, Schmitz, Gießen 1951, pp. 16–25.
- "Struktur und geschichtliche Entwicklung des Landes Hessen." In Festschrift für Edmund E. Stengel zum 70. Geburtstag am 24. Dezember 1949, dargebracht von Freunden, Fachgenossen und Schülern, Böhlau, Münster 1952, pp. 576–589.
- "Die Flurnamensammlung des Hessischen Landesamtes für geschichtliche Landeskunde in Marburg/Lahn." In International centre of onomastics, Onoma, vol. 3, Louvain 1952, pp. 47–50.
- Reinhard Graf zu Solms, Herr zu Münzenberg 1491–1562. Elwert, Marburg 1952.
- Wetzlar und Limburg. Untersuchungen zur territorialgeschichtlichen Dynamik der Landschaft an der unteren Lahn. In Aus Verfassungs- und Landesgeschichte. Festschrift zum 70. Geburtstag von Theodor Mayer, dargebracht von seinen Freunden und Schülern, Thorbecke, Lindau 1955, pp. 259–279.
- "Zur Problematik der Stadtrechtsforschung." In Hessisches Jahrbuch für Landesgeschichte, vol. 5, 1955, pp. 124–134.
- "Geschichtswissenschaft und Heimatforschung." In Der Odenwald. Zeitschrift des Breuberg-Bundes, vol. 4, issues 2 and 3, 1957, pp. 62–63.
- Zwei Untersuchungen über das Wesen der Geschichtskarte. 1. Probleme der kartographischen Darstellung geschichtlicher Vorgänge. 2. Karte und Verfassungsgeschichte. Studien zur "Vielschichtigkeit" der Landesherrschaft. In Hessisches Jahrbuch für Landesgeschichte, vol. 8, 1958, pp. 106–149.
- "Die böhmische Linie des Hauses Solms-Lich." In Hessisches Jahrbuch für Landesgeschichte, vol. 9, 1959, pp. 86–119.
- "Zur Karte 'Stadtrechtsfamilien' im hessischen Atlas." In Hessisches Jahrbuch für Landesgeschichte, vol. 10, 1960, pp. 97–131.
- Geschichtlicher Atlas von Hessen. Established and prepared by Edmund E. Stengel, edited by Friedrich Uhlhorn, Hessisches Landesamt für Landeskunde, Marburg 1961–1978.
- "Süd- und Norddeutschland in landesgeschichtlicher Sicht. Beobachtungen und Anregungen zu drei Karten des geschichtlichen Atlas von Hessen." In Hessisches Jahrbuch für Landesgeschichte, vol. 11, 1961, pp. 42–63.
- "Ein patriarchalisches Zeitalter." In Hessisches Jahrbuch für Landesgeschichte, vol. 12, 1962, pp. 77–129.
- "Otto Graf zu Solms-Hungen (1572–1610). Ein Lebensbild." In Archiv für Hessische Geschichte und Altertumskunde, vol. 28, 1963, pp. 279–295.
- "Geschichte der Burg Hohensolms und ihrer Landschaft." In Hessisches Jahrbuch für Landesgeschichte, vol. 17, 1967, pp. 191–225.
- "Die territorialgeschichtliche Funktion der Burg. Versuch einer kartographischen Darstellung." In Blätter für deutsche Landesgeschichte, vol. 103, 1967, pp. 9–31.
- Grenzbildungen in Hessen. Die Entwicklung der Westgrenze des Kreises Biedenkopf. Jänecke, Hannover 1969.
- "Zur Charakteristik der Anna von Mecklenburg." In Hessisches Jahrbuch für Landesgeschichte, Band 19, 1969, pp. 450–455.
- Die historischen Beziehungen Hessen, Rheinland/Pfalz, Saarland. (Beiträge zur Raumplanung in Hessen, Rheinland-Pfalz, Saarland; Forschungsberichte der Landesarbeitsgemeinschaft zu Hessen; Forschungsberichte der Landesarbeitsgemeinschaft Hessen, Rheinland-Pfalz, Saarland der Akademie für Raumforschung und Landesplanung), Jänecke, Hannover 1974, ISBN 3-7792-5077-2.
- with Walter Schlesinger: Die deutschen Territorien. (Handbuch der deutschen Geschichte.) Deutscher Taschenbuch-Verlag, Munich 1981 (1st edition without cooperation of Walter Schlesinger, ca. 1955), ISBN 3-423-04213-3.
- Geschichte der Grafen zu Solms zwischen Reformation und Westfälischem Frieden. herausgegeben und eingeleitet von Gerhard Menk, Hessische Historische Kommission Darmstadt/Marburg, Darmstadt/Marburg 2011, ISBN 978-3-88443-316-4.

== Literature ==
- Catalogus professorum academiae Marburgensis. Die akademischen Lehrer der Philipps-Universität Marburg. Bearbeitet von Inge Auerbach, vol. 2: Von 1911 bis 1971, Elwert Verlag, Marburg 1979, ISBN 3-7708-0662-X, p. 622.
- Gerhard Menk: Einleitung. II. Friedrich Uhlhorn. Eine archivische und wissenschaftliche Karriere. In Friedrich Uhlhorn: Geschichte der Grafen von Solms zwischen Reformation und Westfälischem Frieden, herausgegeben und eingeleitet von Gerhard Menk, Selbstverlag der Hessischen Historischen Kommissionen in Darmstadt und Marburg, Darmstadt und Marburg 2011, ISBN 978-3-88443-316-4, pp. 43–106.
- Ulrich Reuling: "Der hessische Raum als "Geschichtslandschaft". Die Entwicklung der historischen Raumvorstellungen im Spiegel der hessischen Atlasunternehmen." In Hessisches Jahrbuch für Landesgeschichte, vol. 34, 1984, pp. 163–192.
- Ulrich Reuling: "Von der "Altaswerkstatt" zur Landesbehörde. Das Hessische Landesamt für geschichtliche Landeskunde in Marburg in seiner institutionellen und forschungsgeschichtlichen Entwicklung unter Edmund E. Stengel und Theodor Mayer." In Walter Heinemeyer (ed.): Hundert Jahre Historische Kommission für Hessen 1897–1997, vol. 2, Elwert-Verlag, Marburg 1997, ISBN 3-7708-1083-X, pp. 1169–1203.
- Fred Schwind: "Friedrich Uhlhorn." In Hessisches Jahrbuch für Landesgeschichte, vol. 28, 1978, pp. IX–XI.
